= 2019 Styrian state election =

State election in Austria

← 2015	24 November 2019	2024 →

All 48 seats in the Landtag Styria 25 seats needed for a majority
- Turnout: 606,528 (63.5%) ▼4.4%
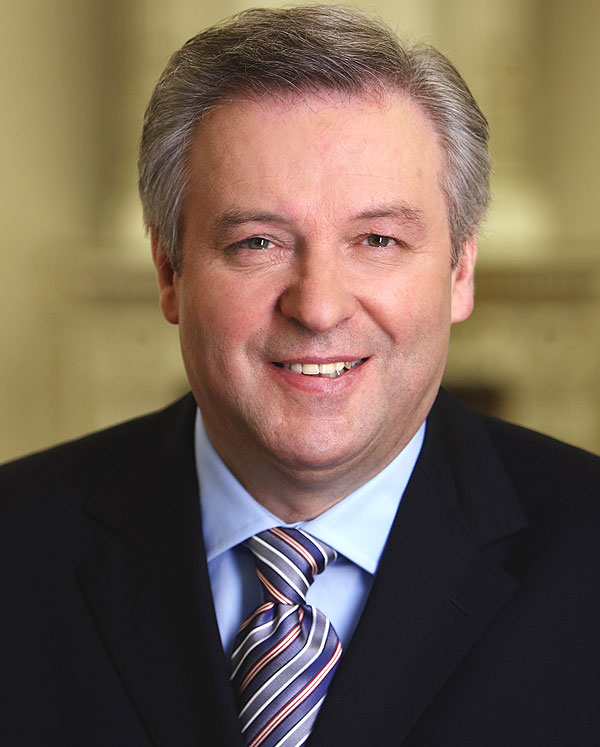

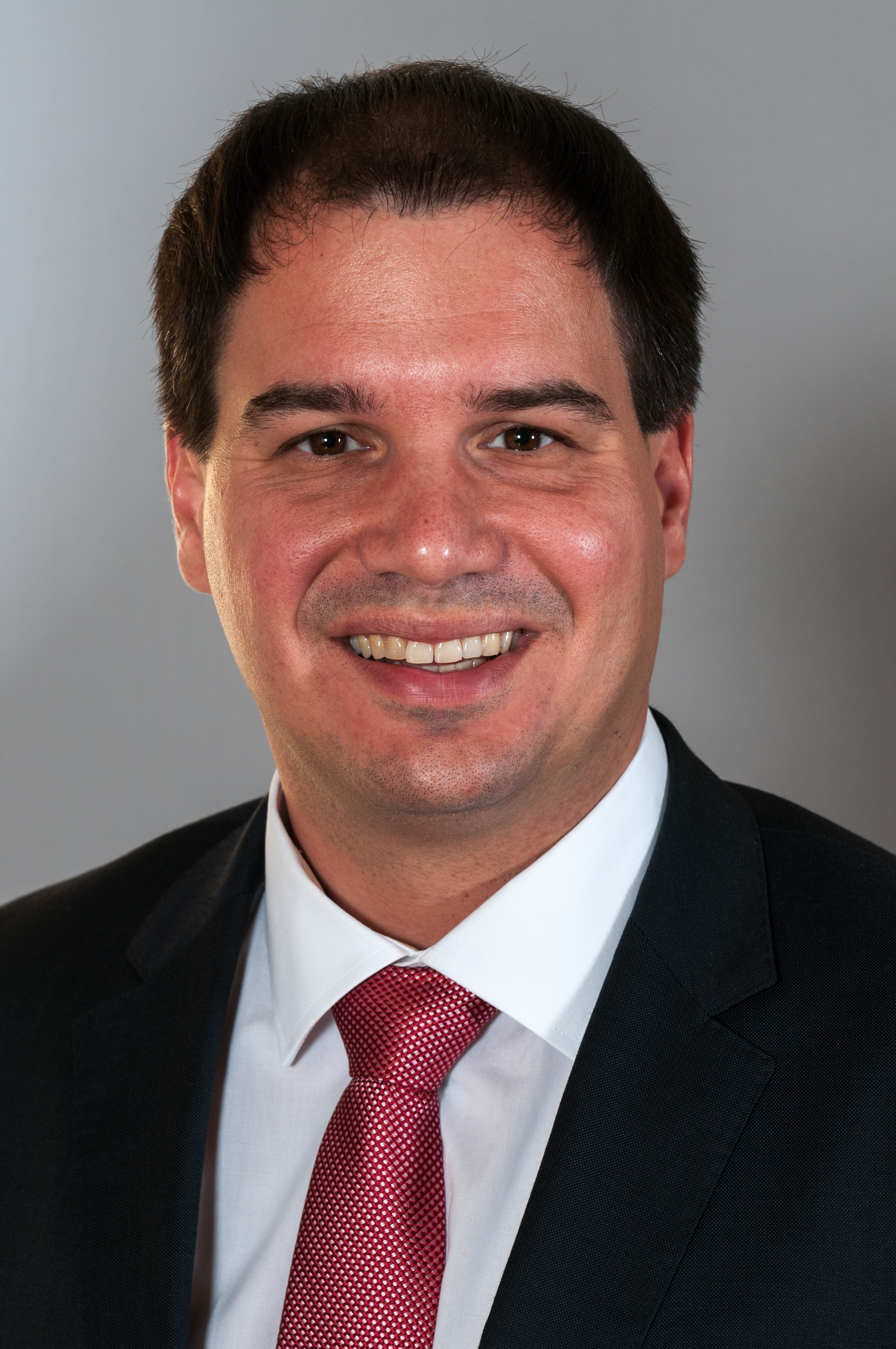

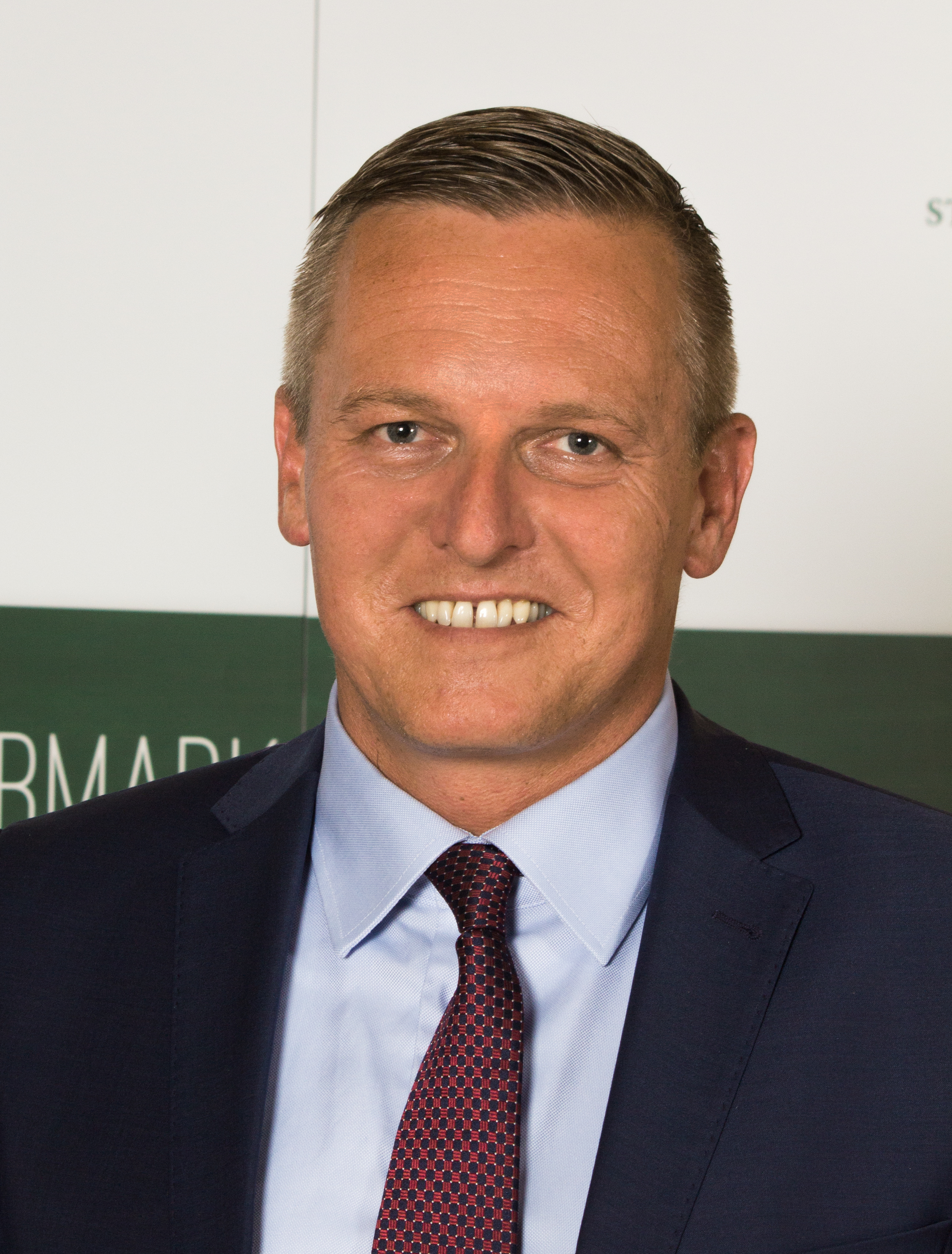

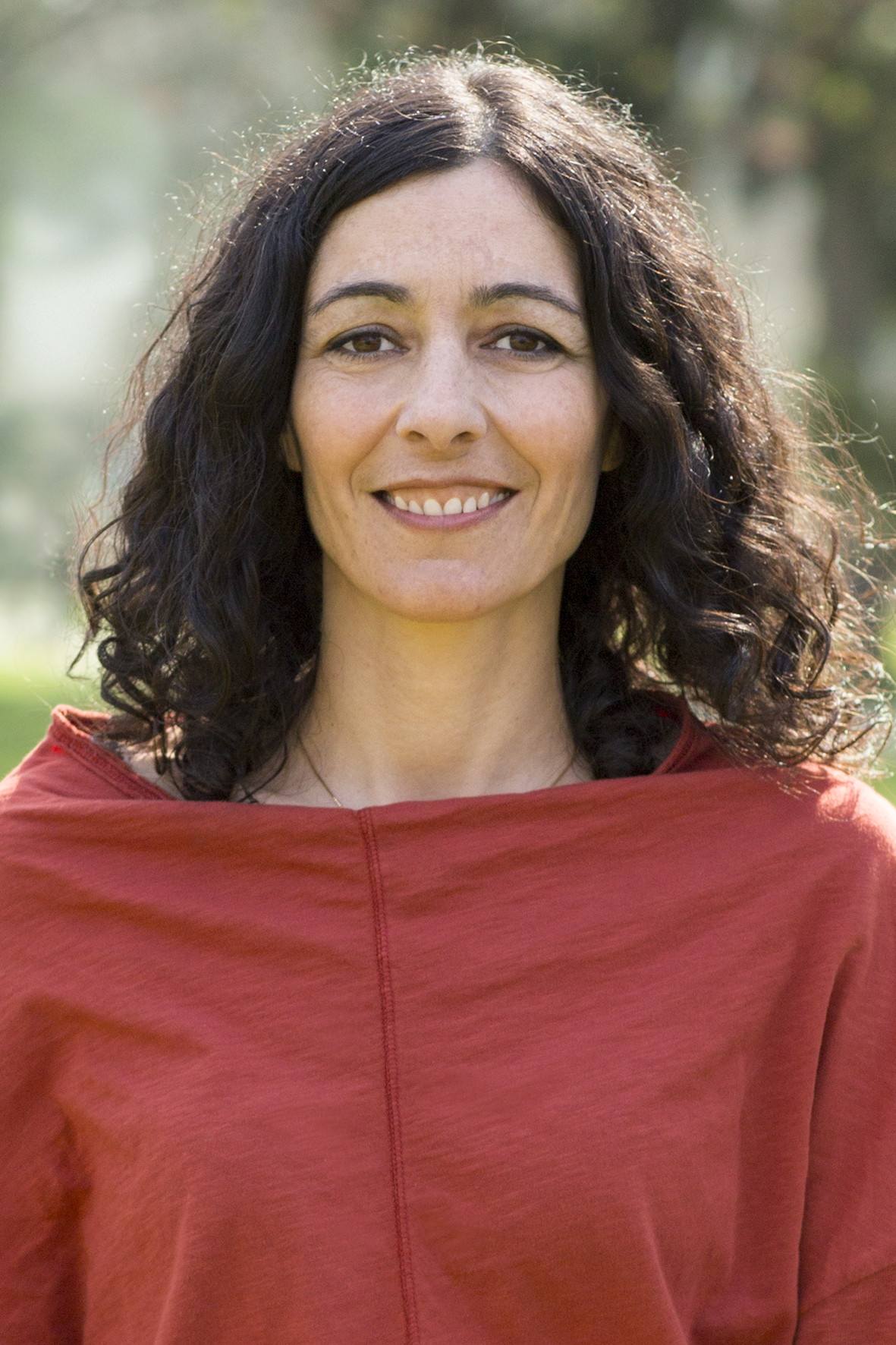

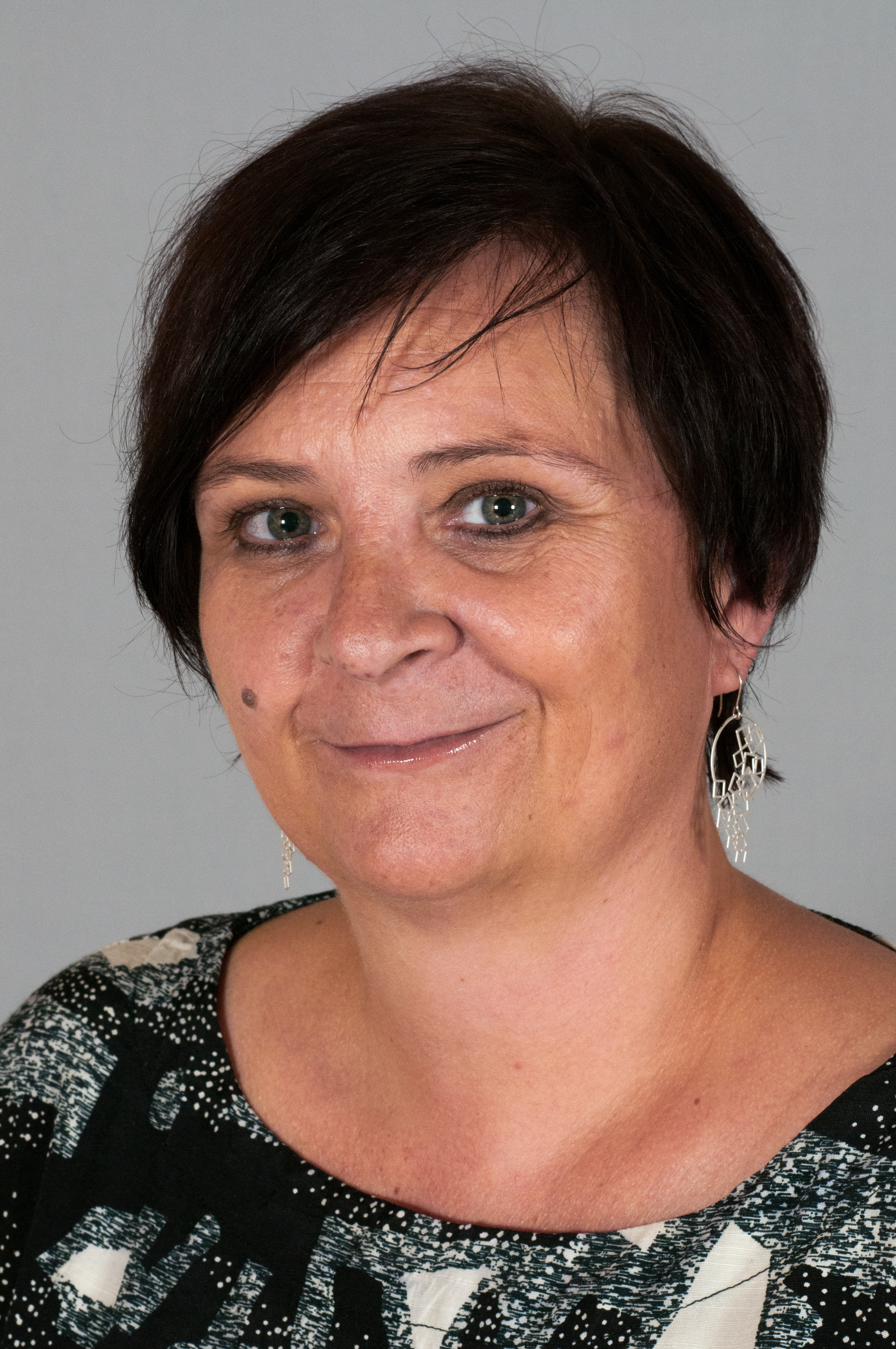
	First party	Second party	Third party
Leader	Hermann Schützenhöfer	Michael Schickhofer	Mario Kunasek
Party	ÖVP	SPÖ	FPÖ
Last election	14 seats, 28.5%	15 seats, 29.3%	14 seats, 26.8%
Seats won	18	12	8
Seat change	▲4	▼3	▼6
Popular vote	217,036	138,572	105,294
Percentage	36.0%	23.0%	17.5%
Swing	▲7.5%	▼6.3%	▼9.3%
	Fourth party	Fifth party	Sixth party
Leader	Sandra Krautwaschl	Claudia Klimt-Weithaler	Niko Swatek
Party	Greens	KPÖ	NEOS
Last election	3 seats, 6.7%	2 seats, 4.2%	0 seats, 2.6%
Seats won	6	2	2
Seat change	▲3	0	▲2
Popular vote	72,749	36,062	32,346
Percentage	12.1%	6.0%	5.4%
Swing	▲5.4%	▲1.8%	▲2.7%
- Results by municipality.
Governor before election
Hermann Schützenhöfer
ÖVP
Elected Governor
Hermann Schützenhöfer
ÖVP

The 2019 Styrian state election was held on 24 November 2019 to elect the members of the Landtag of Styria.

The conservative Austrian People's Party (ÖVP) was the clear winner of the election, winning 36.0% on a swing of 7.6 percentage points. This came to the detriment of the former largest party, the centre-left Social Democratic Party of Austria (SPÖ), which lost six points and fell to second place. The Freedom Party of Austria (FPÖ) fell by nine points. The Greens made a strong showing, winning 12% and doubling their representation to six seats. The Communist Party of Austria (KPÖ) achieved their best result since re-entering the Landtag in 2005 with 6.0%. NEOS – The New Austria (NEOS) doubled its voteshare from the 2015 election, winning 5.4%, and entered the Landtag with two seats.

The outgoing government, a coalition of the SPÖ and ÖVP, was unusual in that it was headed by a member of the smaller party – Hermann Schützenhöfer of the ÖVP. With his party's success in the election, he was re-elected Governor by the Landtag at the head of a renewed ÖVP–SPÖ coalition.

== Background ==
In the 2015 election, the SPÖ–ÖVP government suffered major losses (–9.0 and –8.7 points respectively) to the FPÖ (+16.1 points), with all three parties finishing within a 2.5 percentage point margin of one another. Afterwards, in line with a promise to step down if the SPÖ fell below 30% of votes, Governor Franz Voves announced his resignation. With the SPÖ and ÖVP planning to continue their coalition, the larger SPÖ was expected to retain the governorship. However, after several days of negotiations, the government announced that Voves would be succeeded by ÖVP leader Hermann Schützenhöfer. This was received poorly by opposition parties and the federal SPÖ alike, who criticised it as a breach of political convention. The Styrian SPÖ claimed it had been done to prevent the ÖVP from defecting and forming a coalition with the FPÖ.

In May 2019, the Ibiza affair led to the collapse of the federal government between the ÖVP and FPÖ. The September 2019 federal election took place two months ahead of the Styrian election and saw substantial losses for the FPÖ and SPÖ, and gains for the ÖVP and Greens.

== Electoral system ==
The 48 seats of the Landtag of Styria are elected via open list proportional representation in a two-step process. 40 of the seats are distributed between four multi-member constituencies. For parties to receive any representation in the Landtag, they must win at least one seat in a constituency directly. Seats are distributed in constituencies according to the Hare quota, with eight leveling seats allocated using the D'Hondt method at the state level, to ensure overall proportionality between a party's vote share and its share of seats.

== Contesting parties ==
Name		Ideology	Leader	2015 result	
Name		Ideology	Leader	Votes (%)	Seats
SPÖ	Social Democratic Party of Austria; Sozialdemokratische Partei Österreichs	Social democracy	Michael Schickhofer	29.3%	15 / 48
ÖVP	Austrian People's Party; Österreichische Volkspartei	Christian democracy	Hermann Schützenhöfer	28.5%	14 / 48
FPÖ	Freedom Party of Austria; Freiheitliche Partei Österreichs	Right-wing populism Euroscepticism	Mario Kunasek	26.8%	14 / 48
GRÜNE	The Greens – The Green Alternative; Die Grünen – Die Grüne Alternative	Green politics	Sandra Krautwaschl	6.7%	3 / 48
KPÖ	Communist Party of Austria; Kommunistische Partei Österreichs	Communism	Claudia Klimt-Weithaler	4.2%	2 / 48
NEOS	NEOS – The New Austria and Liberal Forum; NEOS – Das Neue Österreich und Liberales Forum	Liberalism; Pro-Europeanism	Niko Swatek	2.6%	0 / 48

== Opinion polling ==
Polling firm	Fieldwork date	Sample size	SPÖ	ÖVP	FPÖ	Grüne	KPÖ	NEOS	Others	Lead
2019 state election	24 November 2019	–	23.0	36.0	17.5	12.1	6.0	5.4	–	13.0
Research Affairs	8–14 Nov 2019	400	23	35	20	13	5	4	–	12
Karmasin	8–13 Nov 2019	700	22	35	20	13	6	4	–	13
Market	8–13 Nov 2019	774	25	32	18	13	5	7	–	7
Research Affairs	26–31 Oct 2019	400	21	36	21	13	4	5	–	15
IMAS	16–29 Oct 2019	800	25	33	21	12	4	5	–	8
Unknown	29 Oct 2019	?	25	34	18	13	5	5	–	9
OGM	16–22 Oct 2019	746	21	35	20	12	5	5	–	14
GMK	13 Sep 2019	?	27	33	22	8	5	5	–	6
OGM	3–6 Sep 2019	512	23	31	26	7	5	4	–	5
OGM	4 Aug 2019	?	20	33	27	10	5	4	1	6
Market	28–31 Jan 2019	793	27	30	24	9	4	4	1	3
Brand Support	13 Jan 2019	?	24	34	25	7	3	5	2	9
Krone	18 Mar 2018	510	26	34	26	6	3	5	–	8
OGM	21 May 2016	?	25	28	31	7	5	–	4	3
2015 state election	31 May 2015	–	29.3	28.5	26.8	6.7	4.2	2.6	2.0	0.8

== Results ==
Party	Votes	%	+/−	Seats	+/−
Austrian People's Party (ÖVP)	217,036	36.05	+7.60	18	+4
Social Democratic Party of Austria (SPÖ)	138,572	23.02	–6.27	12	–3
Freedom Party of Austria (FPÖ)	105,294	17.49	–9.27	8	–6
The Greens – The Green Alternative (GRÜNE)	72,749	12.08	+5.40	6	+3
Communist Party of Austria (KPÖ)	36,062	5.99	+1.77	2	±0
NEOS – The New Austria (NEOS)	32,346	5.37	+2.73	2	+2
Invalid/blank votes	4,469	–	–	–	–
Total	606,528	100	–	48	0
Registered voters/turnout	955,795	63.46	–4.44	–	–
Source: Styrian Government

Popular vote
ÖVP	36.05%
SPÖ	23.02%
FPÖ	17.49%
GRÜNE	12.08%
KPÖ	5.99%
NEOS	5.37%

Landtag seats
ÖVP	37.50%
SPÖ	25.00%
FPÖ	16.67%
GRÜNE	12.50%
KPÖ	4.17%
NEOS	4.17%

=== Results by constituency ===
Constituency	ÖVP		SPÖ		FPÖ		Grüne		KPÖ		NEOS		Total seats	Turnout
Constituency	%	S	%	S	%	S	%	S	%	S	%	S	Total seats	Turnout
District 1	29.2	4	17.4	2	15.2	2	20.6	3	9.9	1	7.7	1	13	62.1
District 2	47.2	5	18.8	2	19.0	2	8.5	1	2.6		3.9		10	67.0
District 3	38.8	3	23.9	2	21.2	1	8.0		3.7		4.4		6	62.8
District 4	32.8	4	32.7	4	16.7	2	7.6	1	5.8		4.5		11	62.5
State seats		2		2		1		1		1		1	8	
Total	36.0	18	23.0	12	17.5	8	12.1	6	6.0	2	5.4	2	48	63.5
Source: Styrian Government
