= 2015 Styrian state election =

← 2010	31 May 2015	2019 →

All 48 seats in the Landtag of Styria 25 seats needed for a majority
- Turnout: 655,051 (67.9%) ▼1.6%
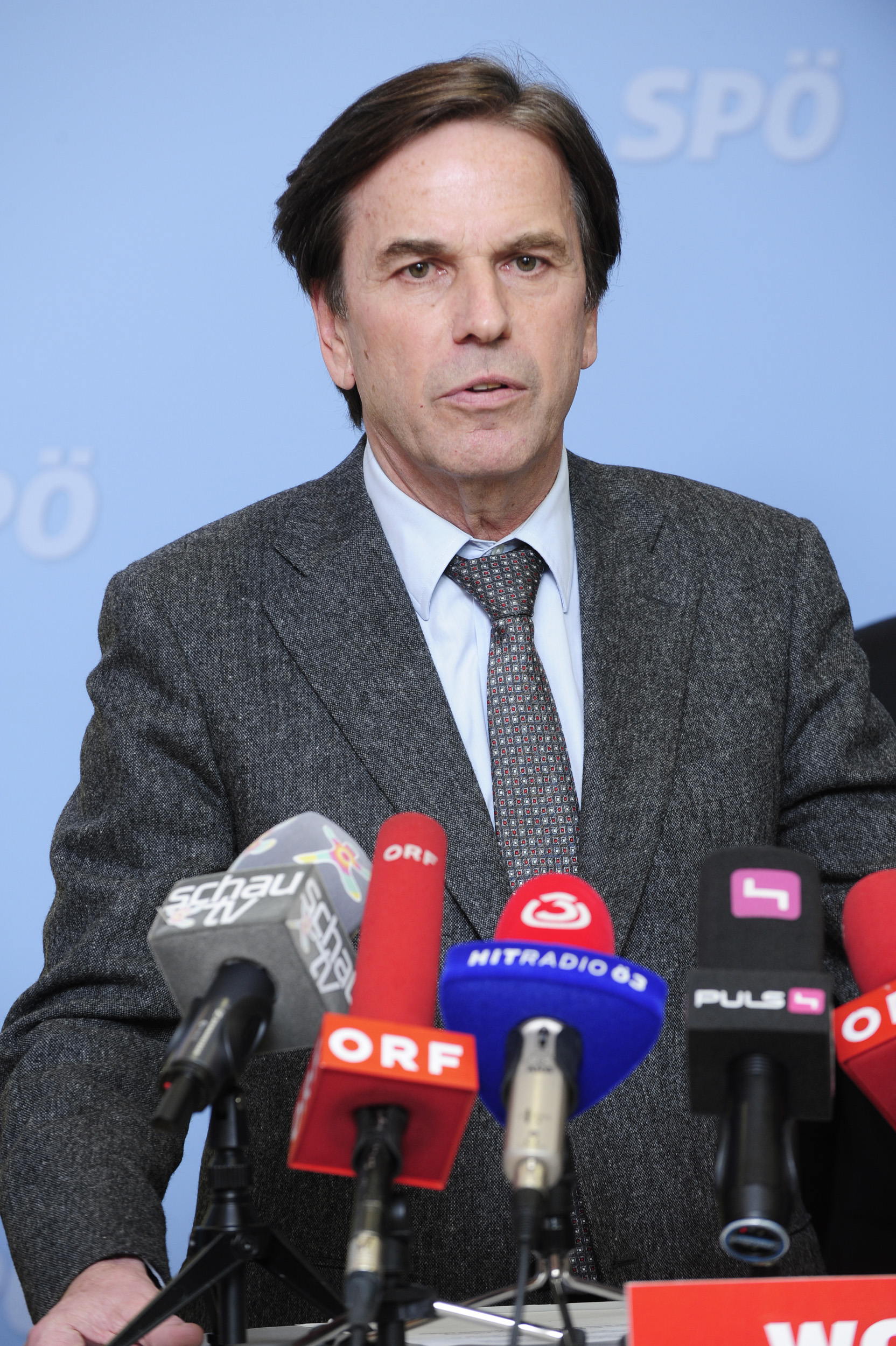

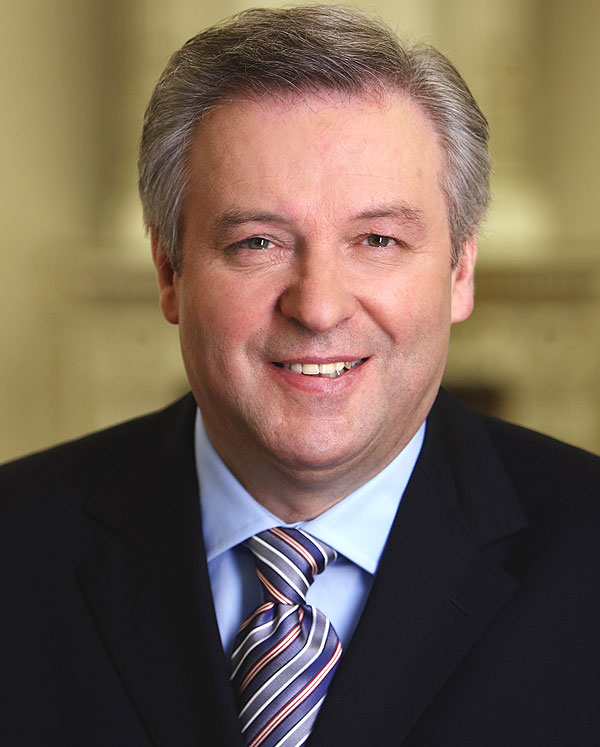

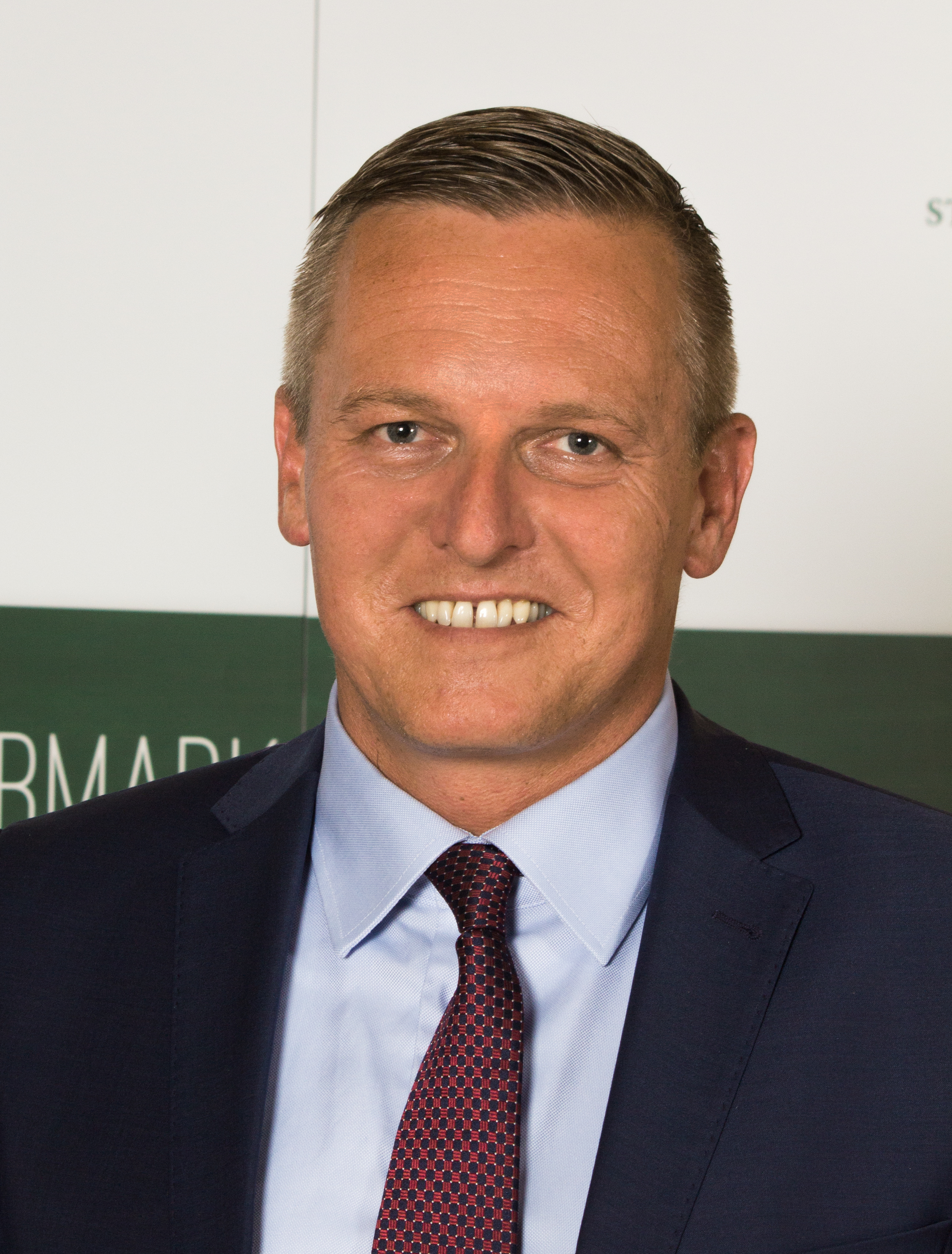

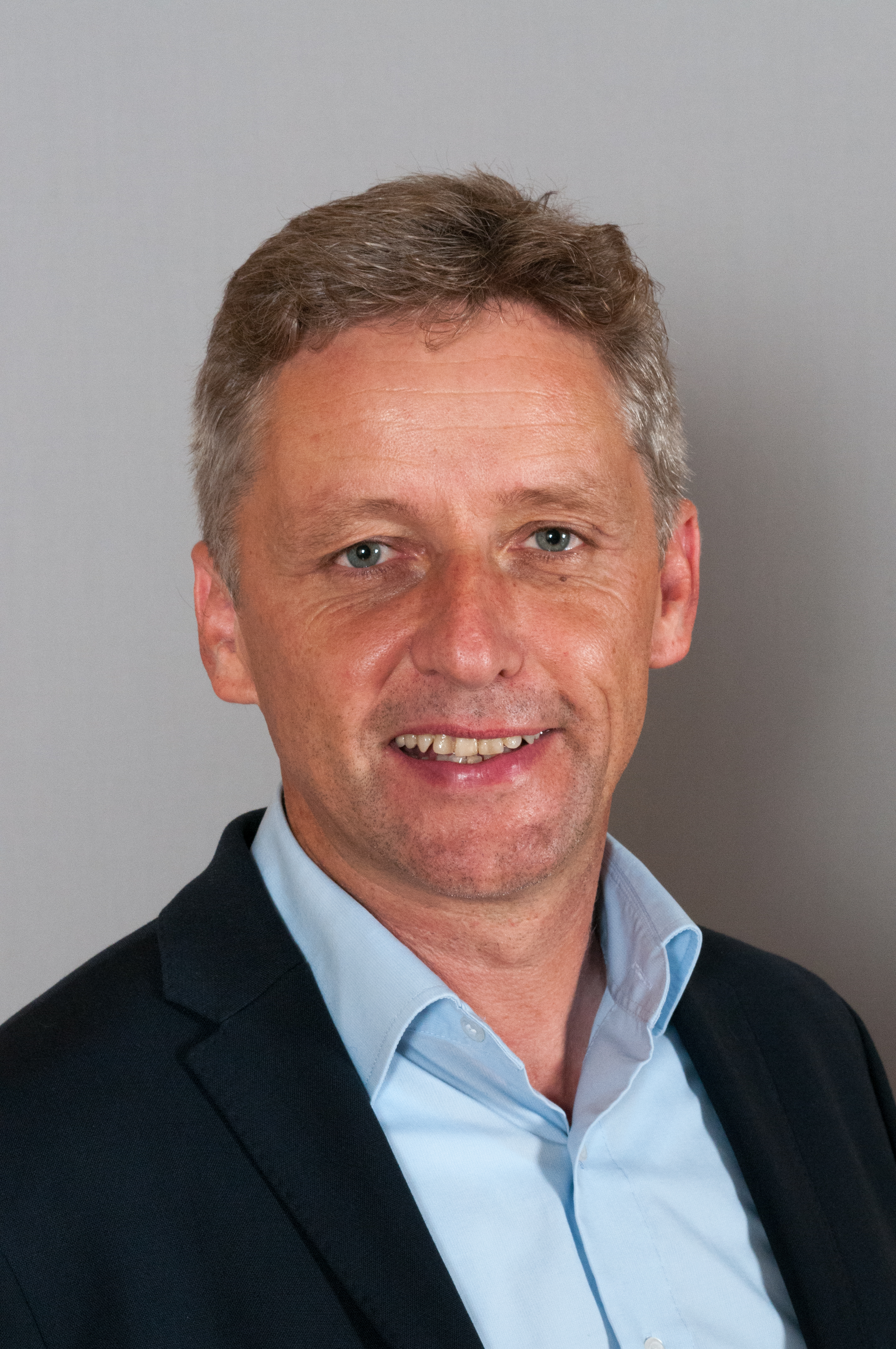

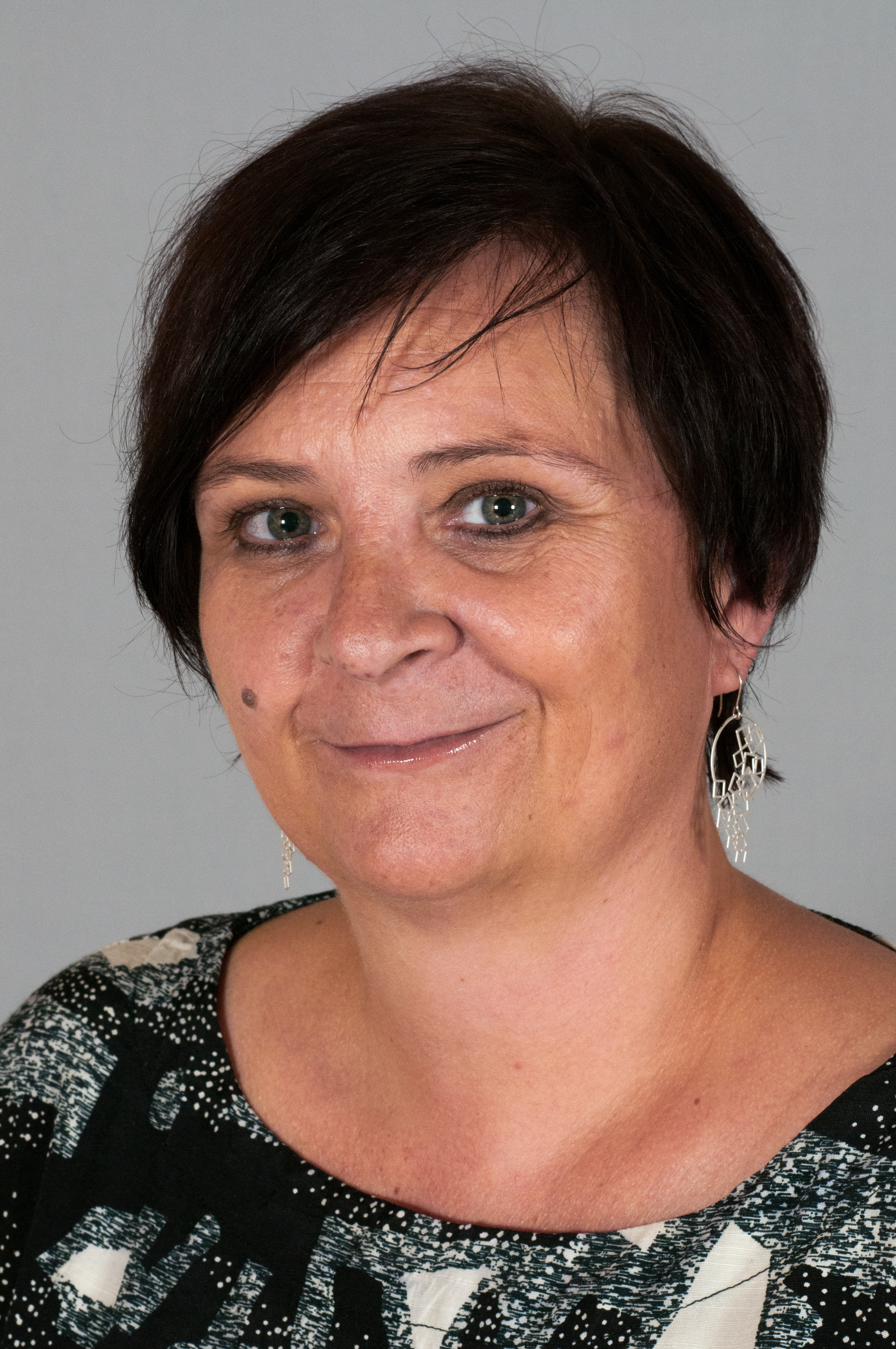
	First party	Second party	Third party
Leader	Franz Voves	Hermann Schützenhöfer	Mario Kunasek
Party	SPÖ	ÖVP	FPÖ
Last election	23 seats, 38.3%	22 seats, 37.2%	6 seats, 10.7%
Seats won	15	14	14
Seat change	▼8	▼8	▲8
Popular vote	189,762	184,301	173,332
Percentage	29.3%	28.5%	26.8%
Swing	▼9.0%	▼8.7%	▲16.1%
	Fourth party	Fifth party
Leader	Lambert Schönleitner	Claudia Klimt-Weithaler
Party	Greens	KPÖ
Last election	3 seats, 5.6%	2 seats, 4.4%
Seats won	3	2
Seat change	0	0
Popular vote	43,272	27,339
Percentage	6.7%	4.2%
Swing	▲1.1%	▼0.2%
- Results by municipality.
Governor before election
Franz Voves
SPÖ
Elected Governor
Hermann Schützenhöfer
ÖVP

The 2015 Styrian state election was held on 31 May 2015 to elect the members of the Landtag of Styria.

The election saw major losses for the Social Democratic Party of Austria (SPÖ) and Austrian People's Party (ÖVP), the two major parties, matched by huge gains for the Freedom Party of Austria (FPÖ). The SPÖ finished first on 29.3% and 15 seats, just ahead of the ÖVP's 28.5% and 14 seats. The FPÖ placed a close third with 26.8%, and tied the ÖVP in seats.

Governor Franz Voves resigned after the election. The SPÖ and ÖVP renewed their coalition government, but during negotiations, it was unexpectedly announced that ÖVP leader Hermann Schützenhöfer would become Governor, despite his party being the smaller of the two. The SPÖ claimed it was a necessary concession to prevent an ÖVP–FPÖ coalition; nonetheless, the announcement caused significant controversy. Schützenhöfer was sworn in on 15 June.

== Background ==
After the 2010 election, the SPÖ won a narrow victory over the ÖVP, and the two parties formed a coalition government.

Prior to amendments made in 2011, the Styrian constitution mandated that cabinet positions in the state government be allocated between parties proportionally in accordance with the share of votes won by each; this is known as Proporz. As such, the government was a perpetual coalition of all parties that qualified for at least one cabinet position. In November 2011, the Landtag voted to amend the constitution to remove this requirement. As such, the 2015 election was the first in post-war Styrian history in which conventional coalition formation could take place.

== Electoral system ==
The 48 seats of the Landtag of Styria are elected via open list proportional representation in a two-step process. 38 of the seats are distributed between four multi-member constituencies. For parties to receive any representation in the Landtag, they must win at least one seat in a constituency directly. Seats are distributed in constituencies according to the Hare quota, with ten leveling seats allocated using the D'Hondt method at the state level, to ensure overall proportionality between a party's vote share and its share of seats.

== Contesting parties ==
Name		Ideology	Leader	2010 result	
Name		Ideology	Leader	Votes (%)	Seats
SPÖ	Social Democratic Party of Austria; Sozialdemokratische Partei Österreichs	Social democracy	Franz Voves	38.3%	23 / 48
ÖVP	Austrian People's Party; Österreichische Volkspartei	Christian democracy	Hermann Schützenhöfer	37.2%	22 / 48
FPÖ	Freedom Party of Austria; Freiheitliche Partei Österreichs	Right-wing populism Euroscepticism	Mario Kunasek	10.7%	6 / 48
GRÜNE	The Greens – The Green Alternative; Die Grünen – Die Grüne Alternative	Green politics	Lambert Schönleitner	5.6%	3 / 48
KPÖ	Communist Party of Austria; Kommunistische Partei Österreichs	Communism	Claudia Klimt-Weithaler	4.4%	2 / 48

In addition to the parties already represented in the Landtag, three parties collected enough signatures to be placed on the ballot:

- NEOS – The New Austria (NEOS)
- Team Stronach (TEAM)
- Pirate Party of Austria (PIRAT)

== Opinion polling ==
Polling firm	Fieldwork date	Sample size	SPÖ	ÖVP	FPÖ	Grüne	KPÖ	TS	NEOS	Others	Lead
2015 state election	31 May 2015	–	29.3	28.5	26.8	6.7	4.2	1.7	2.6	0.2	0.8
OGM	May 2015	503	31–32	28–29	21–22	6–7	5–6	1–2	3–4	1–2	2–4
Gallup	11–13 May 2015	400	31	29	21	8	5	2	4	2	2
Market	4–7 May 2015	398	33	31	17	7	5	1	5	1	2
OGM	May 2015	?	30	28	24	7	6	1	3	1	2
M+R	March 2015	800	34	30	19.5	6.5	4.5	–	3	2	4
Gallup	April 2015	300	31	29	20	8	4	–	5	2	2
Gallup	March 2015	?	32	29	20	8	4	–	5	2	3
meinungsraum.at	January 2015	?	30	28	21	10	3	1	6	1	2
2010 state election	26 September 2010	–	38.3	37.2	10.7	5.6	4.4	–	–	3.9	1.1

== Results ==
Party	Votes	%	+/−	Seats	+/−
Social Democratic Party of Austria (SPÖ)	189,762	29.29	–8.97	15	–8
Austrian People's Party (ÖVP)	184,301	28.45	–8.74	14	–8
Freedom Party of Austria (FPÖ)	173,332	26.76	+16.10	14	+8
The Greens – The Green Alternative (GRÜNE)	43,272	6.68	+1.13	3	±0
Communist Party of Austria (KPÖ)	27,339	4.22	–0.19	2	±0
NEOS – The New Austria (NEOS)	17,078	2.64	New	0	New
Team Stronach (FRANK)	11,292	1.74	New	0	New
Pirate Party of Austria (PIRAT)	1,406	0.22	+0.22	0	±0
Invalid/blank votes	7,269	–	–	–	–
Total	655,051	100	–	48	–8
Registered voters/turnout	964,665	67.90	–1.64	–	–
Source: Styrian Government

Popular vote
SPÖ	29.29%
ÖVP	28.45%
FPÖ	26.76%
GRÜNE	6.68%
KPÖ	4.22%
NEOS	2.64%
Other	1.96%

Landtag seats
SPÖ	31.25%
ÖVP	29.17%
FPÖ	29.17%
GRÜNE	6.25%
KPÖ	4.17%

=== Results by constituency ===
Constituency	SPÖ		ÖVP		FPÖ		Grüne		KPÖ		Others	Total seats	Turnout
Constituency	%	S	%	S	%	S	%	S	%	S	%	Total seats	Turnout
District 1	28.3	4	24.8	3	23.5	3	11.2	1	6.4	1	5.7	12	64.4
District 2	22.0	2	38.1	4	27.9	3	5.2		1.9		4.9	9	72.3
District 3	28.3	2	28.4	2	31.8	2	4.4		2.9		4.1	6	68.3
District 4	36.9	5	24.3	3	26.4	3	4.4		4.5		3.4	11	68.2
State seats		2		2		3		2		1		10	
Total	29.3	15	28.5	14	26.8	14	6.7	3	4.2	2	4.6	48	67.9
Source: Styrian Government

== Aftermath ==
Prior to the election, Governor Franz Voves stated he would resign if the SPÖ fell below 30% of vote share. As the party fell short of this target, albeit by less than one percentage points, Voves announced his resignation. He was replaced as party leader by Michael Schickhöfer. Formal coalition talks between the SPÖ and ÖVP proceeded. As the SPÖ was the larger party, it was naturally expected that they would retain the governorship. However, after several days of negotiations, the government announced that Voves would be succeeded by ÖVP leader Hermann Schützenhöfer. This was received poorly by opposition parties and the federal SPÖ alike, who criticised it as a breach of political convention. The Styrian SPÖ claimed it had been done to prevent the ÖVP from defecting and forming a coalition with the FPÖ. The government took office on 16 June.
