= 2024 Styrian state election =

← 2019	24 November 2024	Next →

All 48 seats in the Landtag of Styria 25 seats needed for a majority
- Turnout: 666,286 (70.8%) ▲7.3%
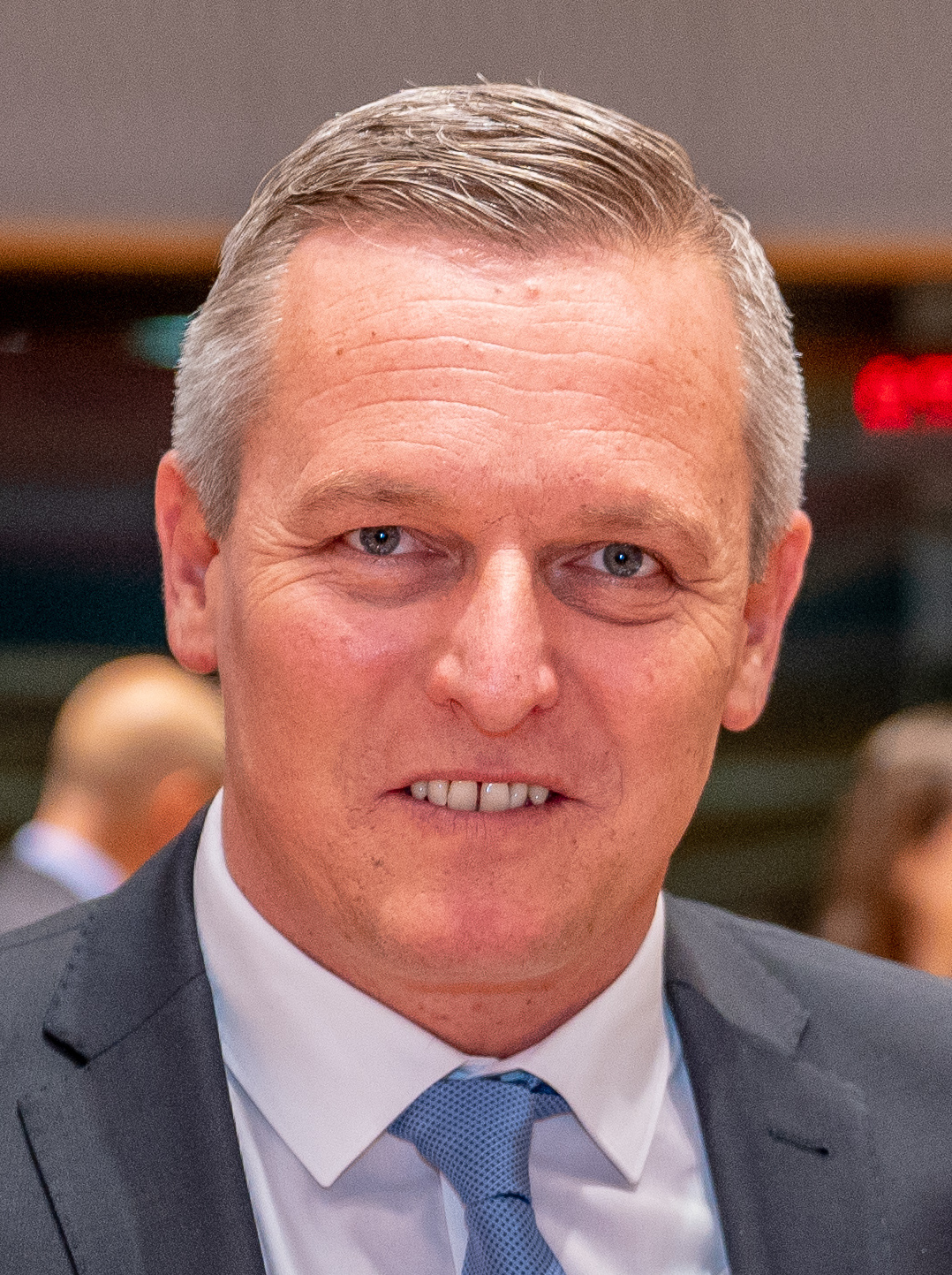

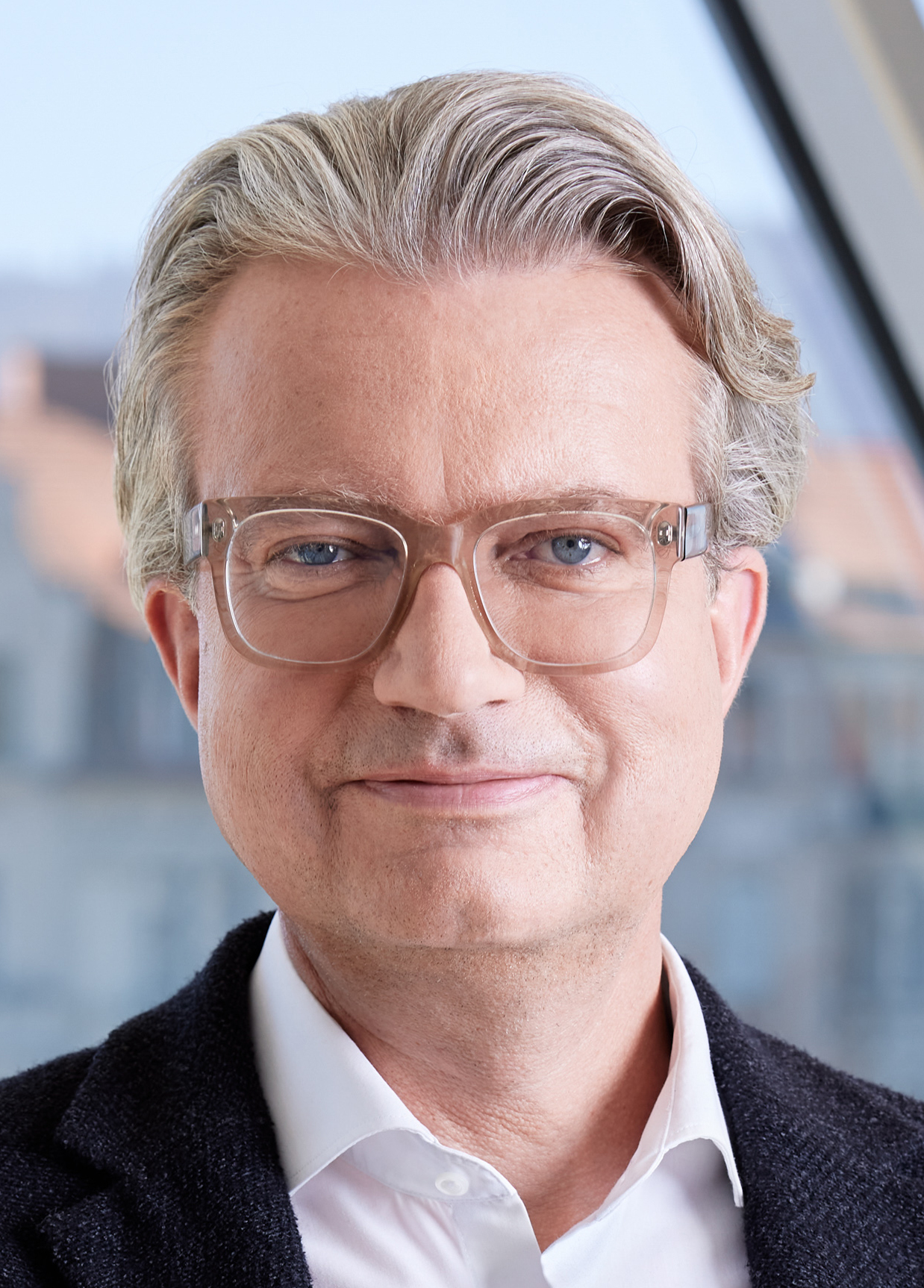

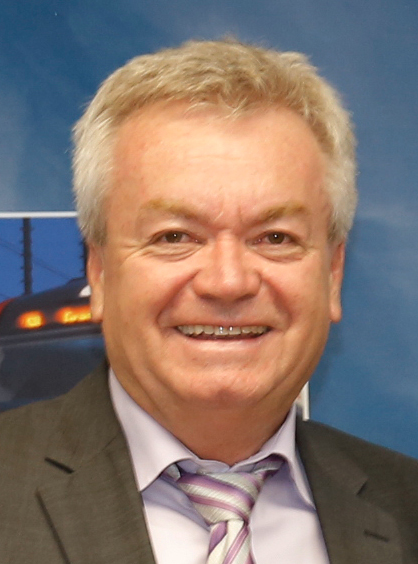

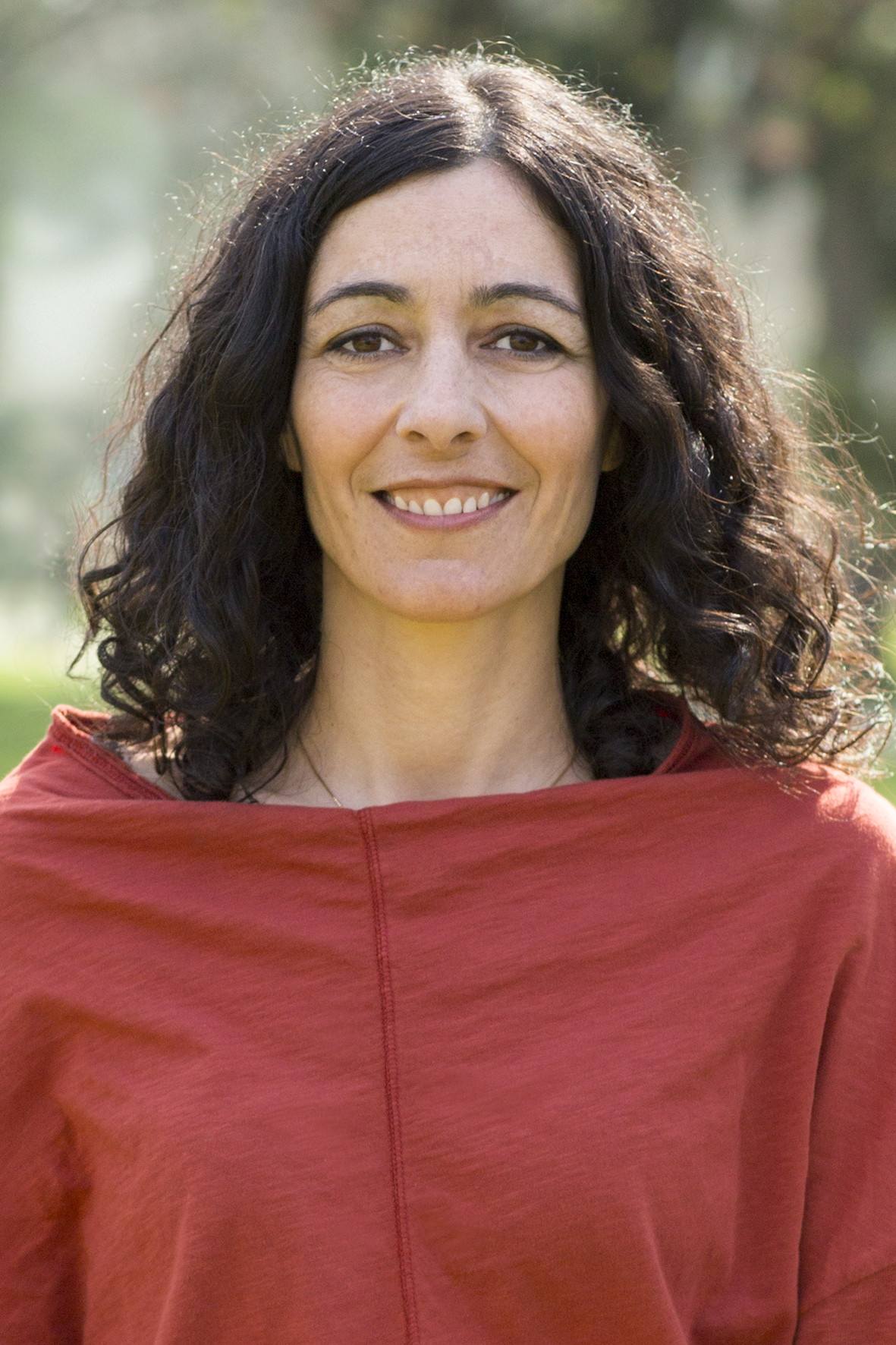

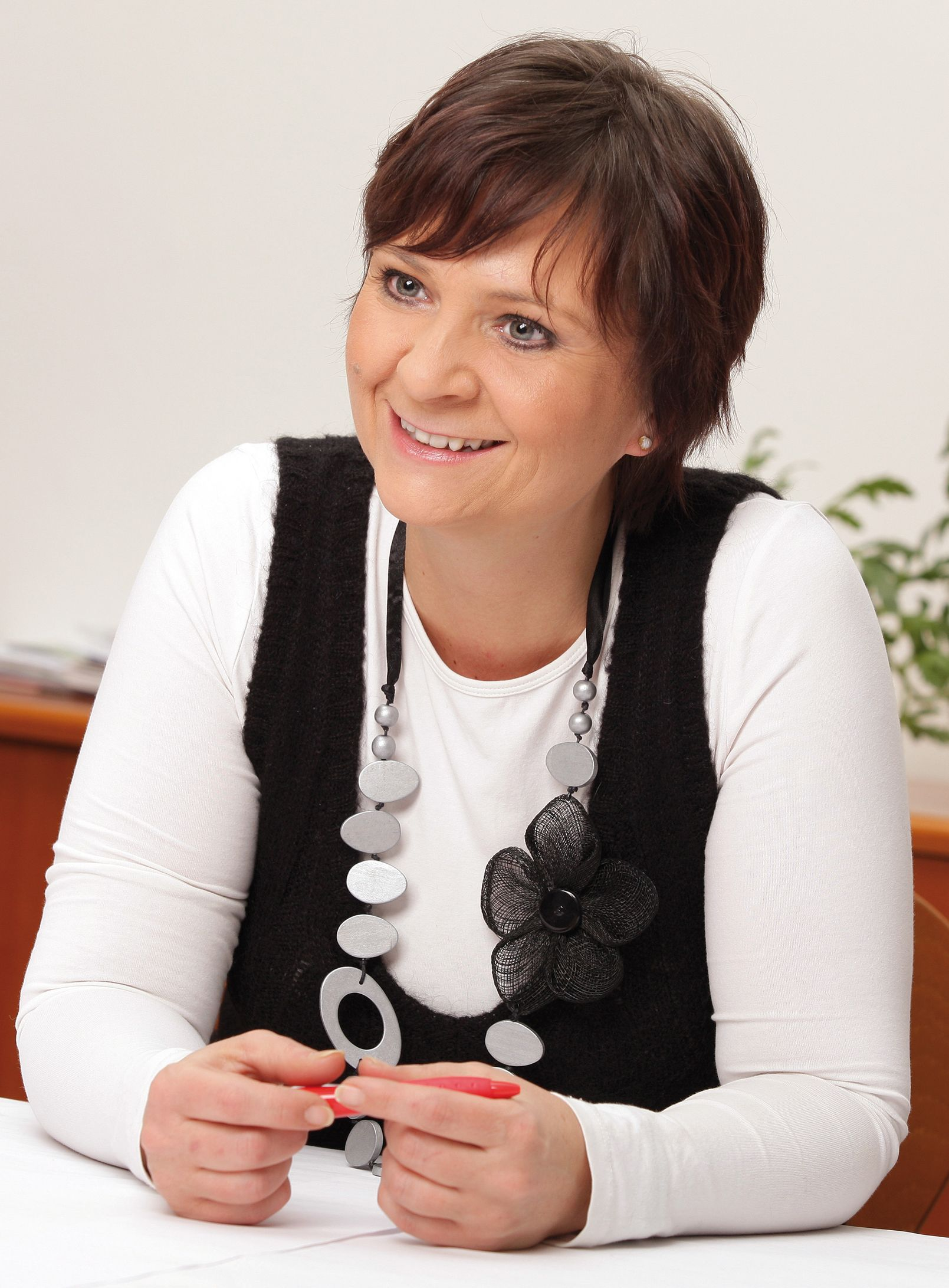
	First party	Second party	Third party
Leader	Mario Kunasek	Christopher Drexler	Anton Lang
Party	FPÖ	ÖVP	SPÖ
Last election	8 seats, 17.5%	18 seats, 36.0%	12 seats, 23.0%
Seats won	17	13	10
Seat change	▲9	▼5	▼2
Popular vote	230,282	177,580	141,517
Percentage	34.8%	26.8%	21.4%
Swing	▲17.3%	▼9.2%	▼1.7%
	Fourth party	Fifth party	Sixth party
Leader	Sandra Krautwaschl	Nikolaus Swatek	Claudia Klimt-Weithaler
Party	Greens	NEOS	KPÖ
Last election	6 seats, 12.1%	2 seats, 5.4%	2 seats, 6.0%
Seats won	3	3	2
Seat change	▼3	▲1	0
Popular vote	40,870	39,753	29,603
Percentage	6.2%	6.0%	4.5%
Swing	▼5.9%	▲0.6%	▼1.5%
- Winning party by municipality: FPÖ (blue), ÖVP (turquoise), SPÖ (red), Tied result (grey).
Governor before election
Christopher Drexler
ÖVP
Elected Governor
Mario Kunasek
FPÖ

The 2024 Styrian state election was held on 24 November 2024 to elect the members of the Landtag of Styria.

The election resulted in heavy losses for the governing ÖVP and moderate losses for its coalition partner, the SPÖ. Together, they lost their majority in the state parliament (Landtag). Both parties also received their worst ever election results in the state of Styria.

The opposition FPÖ received its best result ever, doubling its vote share from the previous election and winning a state election for the first time in the state of Styria. It was also the first time ever that the FPÖ won a state election other than in Carinthia.

The Green Party had strong losses and was cut in half, while the KPÖ also saw their vote share decline. NEOS slightly improved its result compared to the previous election and received its best result ever in Styria.

== Background ==
In 2019, the ÖVP was able to make strong gains and became the largest party with 18 of 48 seats. The SPÖ suffered heavy losses and fell to second place with 12 seats. The FPÖ lost even more support, yet remained the third strongest party. The Greens, KPÖ and NEOS made gains, with the latter entering the state parliament for the first time.

In Styria there is no percentage threshold. To enter the Landtag, each party is required to gain at least one seat in one of the four constituencies (Graz and surroundings, Western Styria, Eastern Styria, Upper Styria).

== Statistics ==
A total of 941,509 people will be eligible to vote, down from 955,795 people in the previous election. A total of 191,452 absentee ballots were requested ahead of the election, or 20.34% of those eligible to vote. When compared to the 2019 state election (102,846 absentee ballots requested, or 10.76% of those eligible), the percentage almost doubled. Compared to the 2024 Austrian legislative election two months earlier, when 231,929 absentee ballots were issued in Styria (or 24.39% of those eligible), requests were down moderately.

== Competing parties ==
The following 6 parties already represented in the Styrian Landtag will run again:

- ÖVP (Steirische Volkspartei – Christopher Drexler)
- SPÖ (Steirische Sozialdemokratie – Anton Lang)
- FPÖ (Freiheitliche Partei Österreichs)
- Greens (Die Grünen – Die Grüne Alternative)
- KPÖ (Kommunistische Partei Österreichs)
- NEOS (NEOS – Die Reformkraft für deine neue Steiermark)

In addition, 3 other parties will compete, but only in the constituency of Graz and surroundings:

- DNA (DNA – Demokratisch – Neutral – Authentisch)
- KFG (Korruptionsfreie Bürgerliste – Team Claudia Schönbacher)
- MFG (MFG – Österreich: Menschen – Freiheit – Grundrechte)

== Opinion polling ==
Polling firm	Fieldwork date	Sample size	ÖVP	SPÖ	FPÖ	Grüne	KPÖ	NEOS	Others	Lead
2024 Styrian state election	24 Nov 2024	–	26.8	21.4	34.8	6.2	4.5	6.0	0.4	8.0
Market-Lazarsfeld/oe24.at	7–11 Nov 2024	826	27	22	33	6	6	6	–	6
Peter Hajek Public Opinion Strategies GmbH/Kleine Zeitung	14–18 Oct 2024	800	26	24	30	8	5	6	1	4
2024 Austrian legislative election	29 Sep 2024	–	27.0	18.6	32.2	7.6	3.1	8.2	3.3	5.2
Peter Hajek Public Opinion Strategies GmbH/Kleine Zeitung	26 Apr–2 May 2024	810	22	21	29	10	11	6	1	7
M-Research/GRÜNE Steiermark	23 Feb–5 Mar 2024	750	21.0	25.5	23.1	12.4	9.5	7.0	–	2.4
OGM/FPÖ Steiermark	12–20 Feb 2024	1,033	23	24	25	9	13	5	1	1
M&R Wien/ÖVP Steiermark	30 Nov–7 Dec 2023	800	28	24	25	9	8	6	–	3
Market/Standard	19–24 Jan 2024	781	20	24	26	8	14	7	1	2
Triple M Matzka/NEOS Steiermark	Late Oct – early Nov 2022	800	21	24	23	11	12	8	1	1
OGM/FPÖ Steiermark	23–28 Sep 2022	547	24	24	24	11	12	5	–	Tie
IMAS/NEOS Steiermark	Feb – Mar 2021	850	34.1	22.9	17.9	11.5	5.2	8.5	–	11.2
2019 Styrian state election	24 Nov 2019	–	36.0	23.0	17.5	12.1	6.0	5.4	–	13.1

== Final results ==
Party	Votes	%	+/−	Seats	+/−
Freedom Party of Austria (FPÖ)	230,282	34.8	+17.3	17	+9
Austrian People's Party (ÖVP)	177,580	26.8	–9.2	13	–5
Social Democratic Party of Austria (SPÖ)	141,517	21.4	–1.7	10	–2
The Greens – The Green Alternative (GRÜNE)	40,870	6.2	–5.9	3	–3
NEOS – The New Austria (NEOS)	39,753	6.0	+0.6	3	+1
Communist Party of Austria (KPÖ)	29,603	4.5	–1.5	2	±0
Demokratisch – Neutral – Authentisch (DNA)	1,634	0.3	New	0	New
Korruptionsfreie Bürgerliste (KFG)	606	0.1	New	0	New
Menschen – Freiheit – Grundrechte (MFG)	552	0.1	New	0	New
Valid votes	662,397	99.4	–	–	–
Invalid/blank votes	3,889	0.6	–	–	–
Total	666,286	100	–	48	0
Registered voters/turnout	941,509	70.8	+7.3	–	–
Source: ORF

== Aftermath ==
On 27 November, after publication of the official results, the FPÖ met with the leaders of the other 5 parties represented in the new Landtag. The Greens and KPÖ ruled out a coalition with the FPÖ on election day or before already, but nonetheless held initial talks with Mario Kunasek as part of the historical convention. Media described a coalition between the FPÖ and the SPÖ as the most likely outcome of the initial talks and a decision could be made by Kunasek and the FPÖ as soon as 29 November. There were several important party members from the SPÖ who were publicly open to the possibility of a coalition with the FPÖ, such as party leader Anton Lang, or the mayor of Leoben, Kurt Wallner. The youth organizations of the SPÖ were opposed, as was federal SPÖ leader Andreas Babler, but he granted autonomy to the Styria SPÖ when it came to decision making on forming a new state government.

Despite earlier media speculations, the FPÖ decided to start coalition talks with the ÖVP instead. On December 17, the new FPÖ–ÖVP government was presented to the public and it was sworn into office on December 18. The cabinet was split equally between four FPÖ members and four ÖVP members. The FPÖ got the gubernatorial post for the first time ever in Styria and for the first time in a state other than Carinthia. Four members of the government are women and four are men.

The new FPÖ–ÖVP government was elected by the newly convened Landtag of Styria on December 18 and FPÖ leader Mario Kunasek was elected Styria's first FPÖ Governor with the votes of FPÖ and ÖVP. All opposition parties voted against him. The previous Styrian governor and ÖVP leader Christopher Drexler – who still led coalition talks for his party – was ousted in an internal ÖVP leadership election after talks concluded and was replaced by Manuela Khom. Drexler was elected as the deputy speaker of the new Styrian Landtag instead.
