= 2010 Styrian state election =

| ← 2005 | 26 September 2010 | 2015 → |

All 56 seats in the Landtag of Styria 29 seats needed for a majority All 9 seats in the state government
- Turnout: 672,379 (69.5%) ▼6.6%
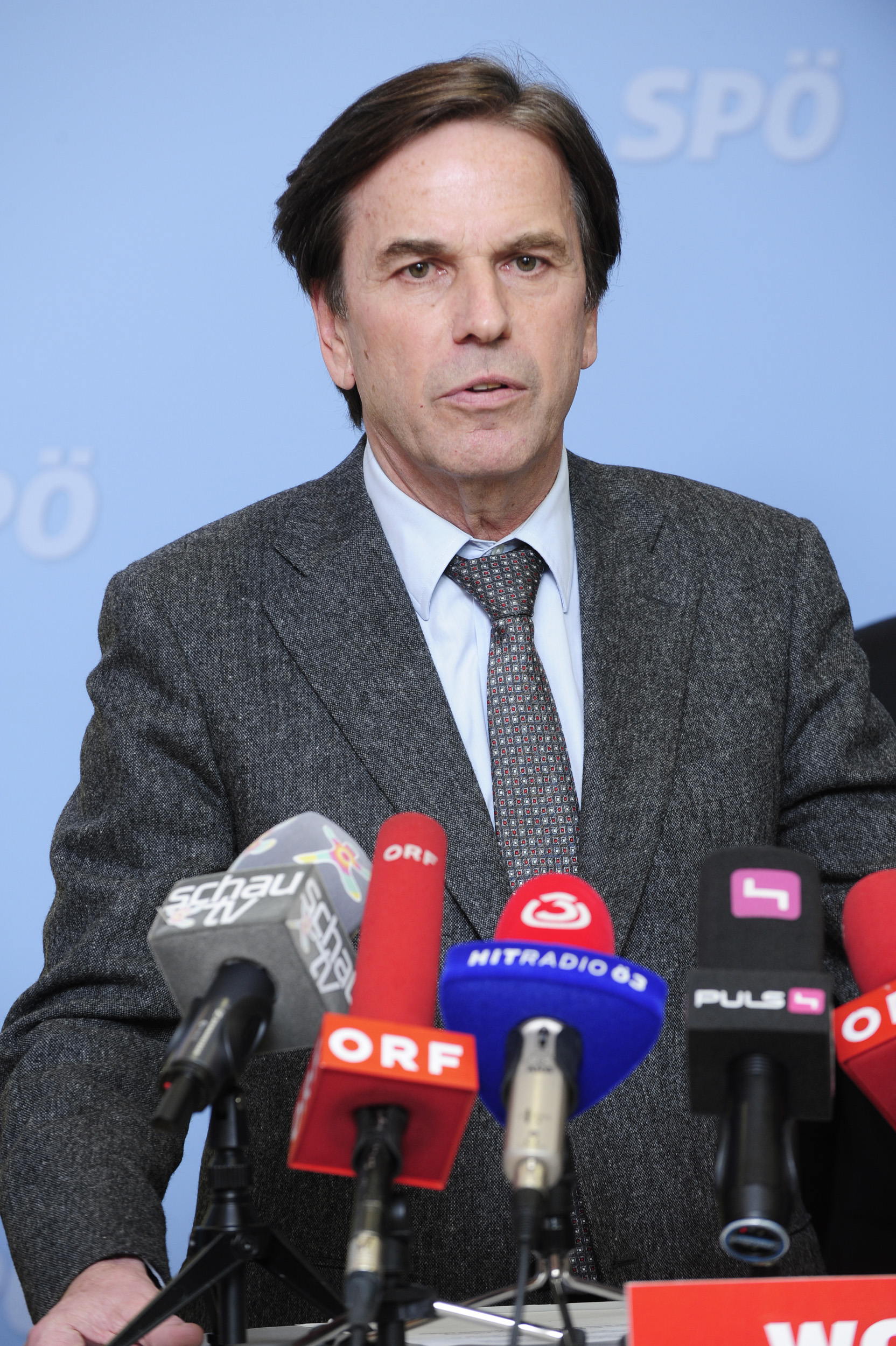

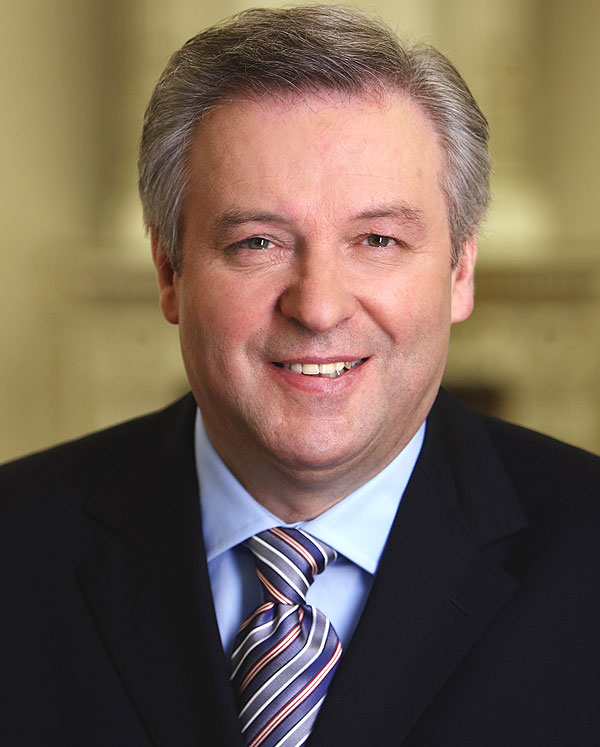

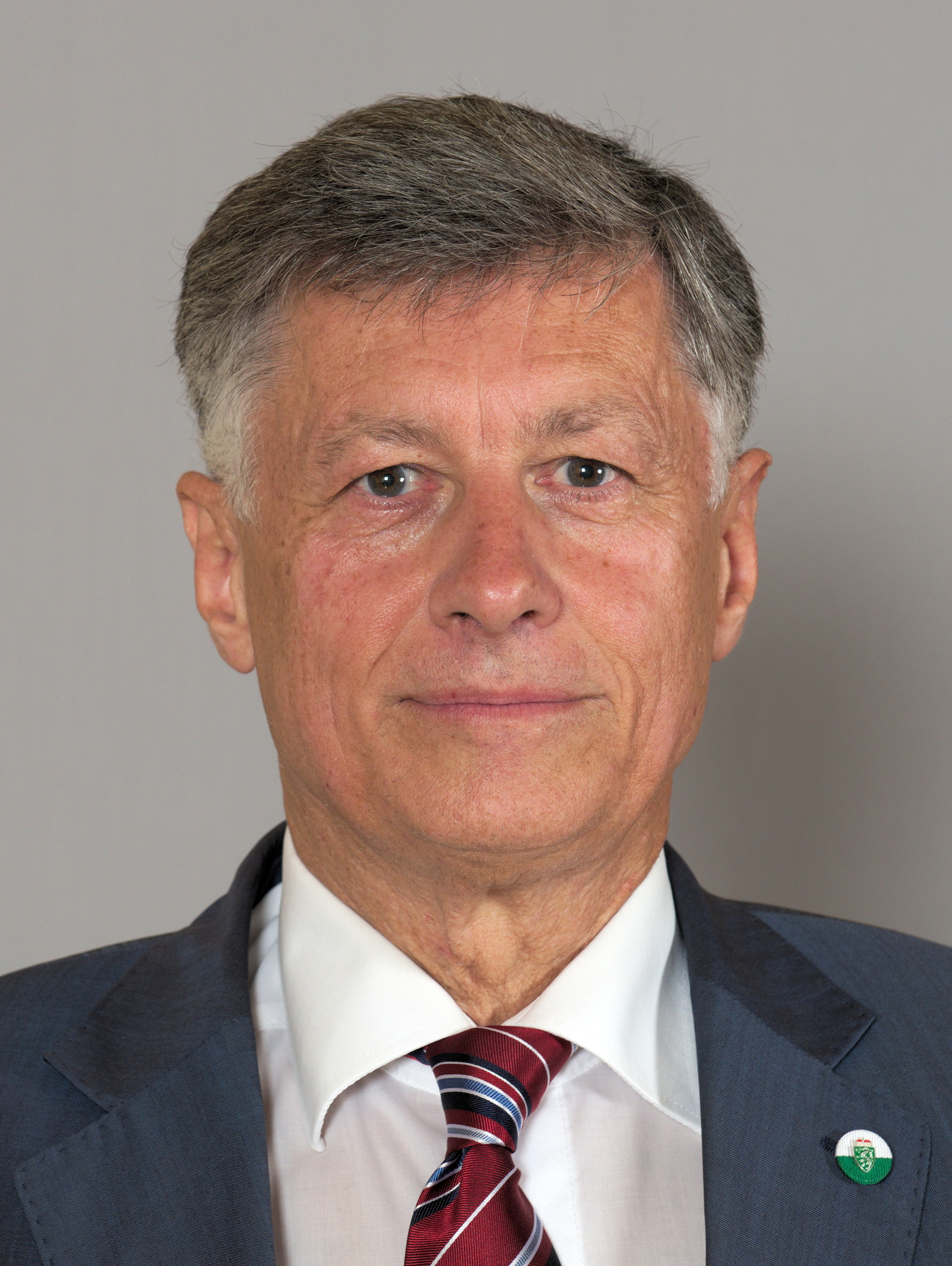

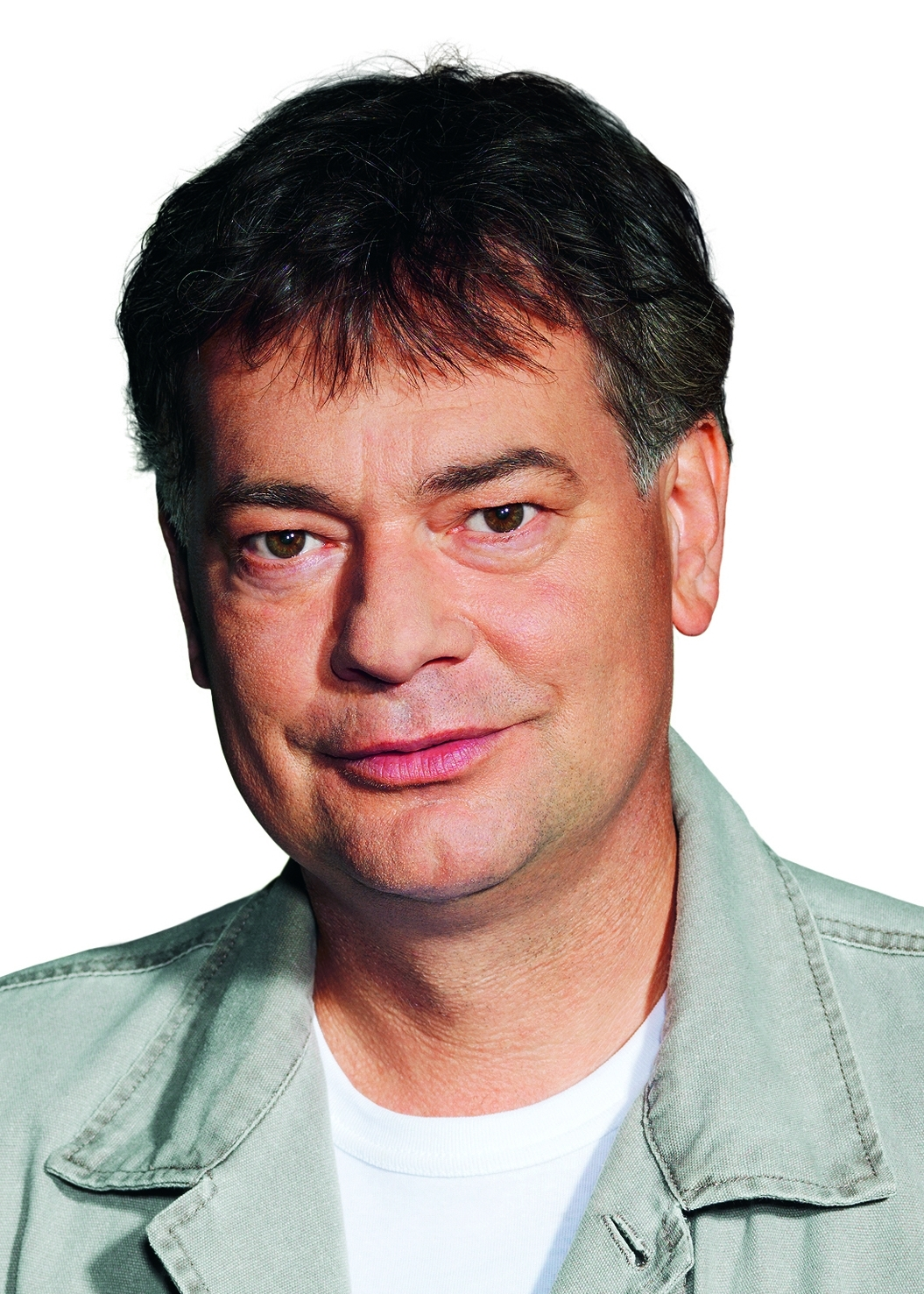

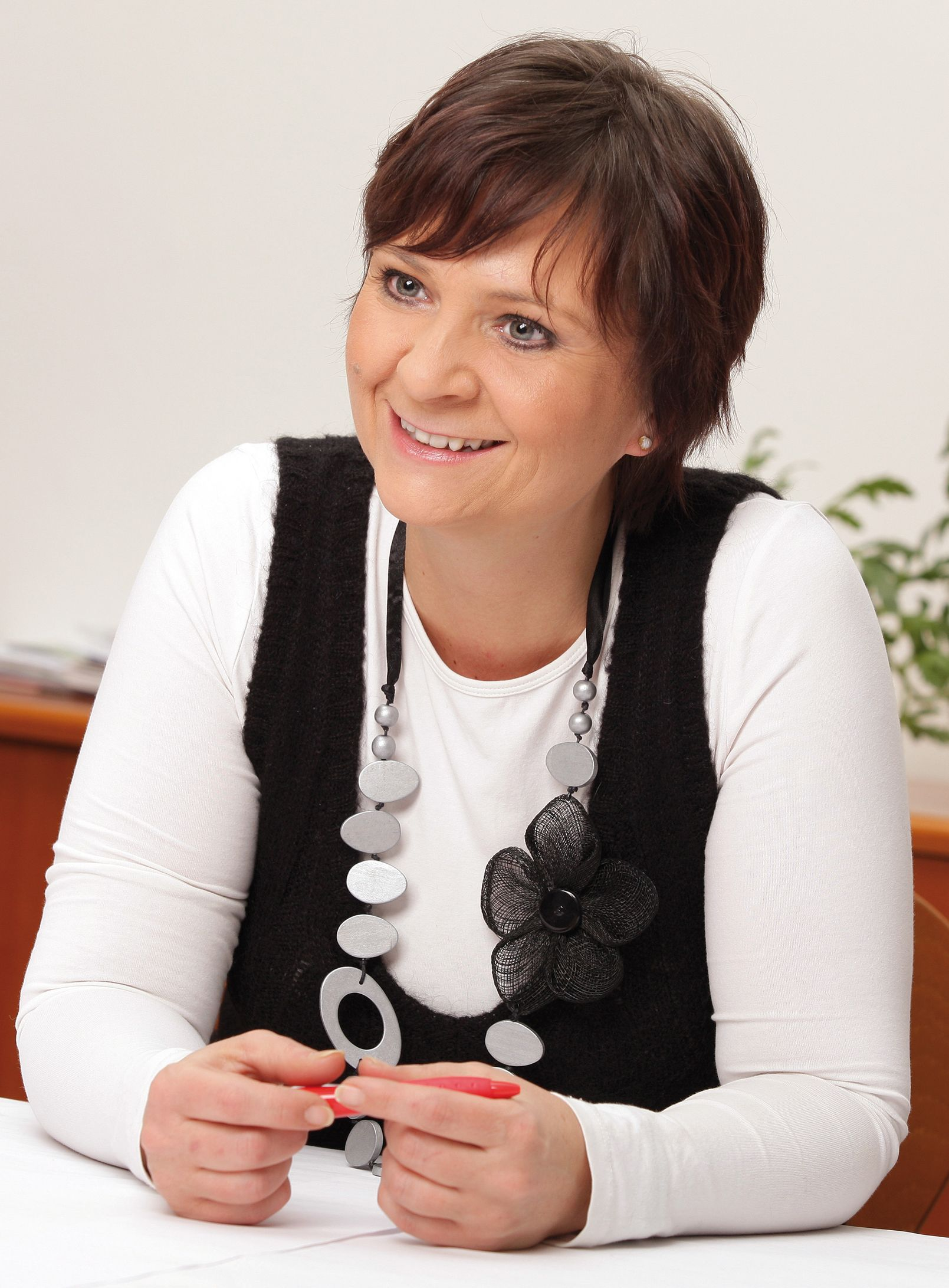
| | First party | Second party | Third party |
|---|---|---|---|
| Leader | Franz Voves | Hermann Schützenhöfer | Gerhard Kurzmann |
| Party | SPÖ | ÖVP | FPÖ |
| Last election | 25 seats, 41.7% | 24 seats, 38.7% | 0 seats, 4.6% |
| Seats won | 23 | 22 | 6 |
| Seat change | ▼2 | ▼2 | ▲6 |
| Popular vote | 253,878 | 246,755 | 70,708 |
| Percentage | 38.3% | 37.2% | 10.7% |
| Swing | ▼3.4% | ▼1.5% | ▲6.1% |
| | Fourth party | Fifth party |
| Leader | Werner Kogler | Claudia Klimt-Weithaler |
| Party | Greens | KPÖ |
| Last election | 3 seats, 4.7% | 4 seats, 6.3% |
| Seats won | 3 | 2 |
| Seat change | 0 | ▼2 |
| Popular vote | 36,834 | 29,231 |
| Percentage | 5.6% | 4.4% |
| Swing | ▲0.8% | ▼1.9% |
Governor before election
Franz Voves
SPÖ
Elected Governor
Franz Voves
SPÖ

The 2010 Styrian state election was held on 26 September 2010 to elect the members of the Landtag of Styria.

The Social Democratic Party of Austria (SPÖ) narrowly retained first place against the Austrian People's Party (ÖVP), with both parties taking losses. The Freedom Party of Austria (FPÖ) was the main winner of the election, returning to the Landtag after falling out five years earlier; it won 10.7% of the vote and six seats, taking two each from the SPÖ, ÖVP, and Communist Party of Austria (KPÖ). Governor Franz Voves of the SPÖ was subsequently elected to a second term by the Landtag.

== Background ==
Prior to amendments made in 2011, the Styrian constitution mandated that cabinet positions in the state government (state councillors, German: Landesräten) be allocated between parties proportionally in accordance with the share of votes won by each; this is known as Proporz. As such, the government was a perpetual coalition of all parties that qualified for at least one state councillor.

The 2005 election brought significant changes in Styrian politics. The SPÖ won a narrow victory over the ÖVP, becoming the largest party in the Landtag for the first time since 1953; Franz Voves became the first SPÖ governor of Styria. The FPÖ also lost all its seats for the first time ever. The KPÖ returned to the Landtag after a 35-year absence, placing third with 6.3% of votes and four seats, on the back of a popular campaign and recent success in Graz. After the election, the SPÖ had five state councillors and the ÖVP four.

== Electoral system ==
The 56 seats of the Landtag of Styria were elected via open list proportional representation in a two-step process. 48 of the seats were distributed between four multi-member constituencies. For parties to receive any representation in the Landtag, they must win at least one seat in a constituency directly. Seats were distributed in constituencies according to the Hare quota, with eight leveling seats allocated using the D'Hondt method at the state level, to ensure overall proportionality between a party's vote share and its share of seats.

== Contesting parties ==
| Name | | Ideology | Leader | 2005 result | | |
| Name | | Ideology | Leader | Votes (%) | Seats | Councillors |
|---|---|---|---|---|---|---|
| SPÖ | Social Democratic Party of Austria; Sozialdemokratische Partei Österreichs | Social democracy | Franz Voves | 41.7% | 25 / 56 | 5 / 9 |
| ÖVP | Austrian People's Party; Österreichische Volkspartei | Christian democracy | Hermann Schützenhöfer | 38.7% | 24 / 56 | 4 / 9 |
| KPÖ | Communist Party of Austria; Kommunistische Partei Österreichs | Communism | Claudia Klimt-Weithaler | 6.3% | 4 / 56 | |
| GRÜNE | The Greens – The Green Alternative; Die Grünen – Die Grüne Alternative | Green politics | Werner Kogler | 4.7% | 3 / 56 | |

In addition to the parties already represented in the Landtag, four parties collected enough signatures to be placed on the ballot:

- Freedom Party of Austria (FPÖ)
- Alliance for the Future of Austria (BZÖ)
- Christian Party of Austria (CPÖ)
- Party for the Environment, People and Labour (PUMA)

== Opinion polling ==
| Polling firm | Fieldwork date | Sample size | SPÖ | ÖVP | KPÖ | Grüne | FPÖ | BZÖ | Others | Lead |
|---|---|---|---|---|---|---|---|---|---|---|
| 2010 state election | 26 September 2010 | – | 38.3 | 37.2 | 4.4 | 5.6 | 10.7 | 3.0 | 1.0 | 1.1 |
| OGM/Kurier | 18 Sep 2010 | ? | 36.5 | 36.5 | 4.5 | 6.5 | 11.5 | 2.5 | 2.0 | Tie |
| Humaninstitut | 11–18 Sep 2010 | 850 | 39 | 36 | 3 | 8 | 7 | 5 | 2 | 3 |
| Gallup | 18 Sep 2010 | ? | 38 | 37 | 4 | 7 | 9 | 3 | 2 | 1 |
| IMAS | 15 Sep 2010 | 906 | 39 | 38 | 6 | 6 | 7 | 3 | 1 | 1 |
| Gallup | 10 Sep 2010 | ? | 37 | 37 | 4 | 6 | 10 | – | 6 | Tie |
| GMK | 10 Sep 2010 | ? | 39 | 38 | 5 | 5 | 10 | 2 | 1 | 1 |
| Market | 2 Sep 2010 | ? | 38 | 36 | 5 | 7 | 8 | 3 | 3 | 2 |
| Market | 29 Aug 2010 | 400 | 39 | 37 | 6 | 6 | 7 | 3 | 2 | 2 |
| Gallup | 15 Aug 2010 | 400 | 38 | 37 | 3 | 6 | 11 | 2 | 3 | 1 |
| 2005 state election | 2 October 2005 | – | 41.7 | 38.7 | 6.3 | 4.7 | 4.6 | 1.7 | 2.3 | 3.0 |

== Results ==
| Party | Votes | % | +/− | Seats | +/− | Coun. | +/− |
|---|---|---|---|---|---|---|---|
| Social Democratic Party of Austria (SPÖ) | 253,878 | 38.26 | –3.41 | 23 | –2 | 4 | –1 |
| Austrian People's Party (ÖVP) | 246,755 | 37.19 | –1.47 | 22 | –2 | 4 | ±0 |
| Freedom Party of Austria (FPÖ) | 70,708 | 10.66 | +6.10 | 6 | +6 | 1 | +1 |
| The Greens – The Green Alternative (GRÜNE) | 36,834 | 5.55 | +0.81 | 3 | ±0 | 0 | ±0 |
| Communist Party of Austria (KPÖ) | 29,231 | 4.41 | –1.93 | 2 | –2 | 0 | ±0 |
| Alliance for the Future of Austria (BZÖ) | 19,775 | 2.98 | +1.26 | 0 | ±0 | 0 | ±0 |
| Christian Party of Austria (CPÖ) | 4,762 | 0.72 | New | 0 | New | 0 | New |
| Party for the Environment, People and Labour (PUMA) | 1,581 | 0.24 | New | 0 | New | 0 | New |
| Invalid/blank votes | 8,855 | – | – | – | – | – | – |
| Total | 672,279 | 100 | – | 56 | 0 | 9 | 0 |
| Registered voters/turnout | 966,900 | 69.54 | –6.64 | – | – | – | – |
Source: Styrian Government

Popular vote
| SPÖ | 38.26% |
| ÖVP | 37.19% |
| FPÖ | 10.66% |
| GRÜNE | 5.55% |
| KPÖ | 4.41% |
| BZÖ | 2.98% |
| Other | 0.96% |

Landtag seats
| SPÖ | 41.07% |
| ÖVP | 39.29% |
| FPÖ | 10.71% |
| GRÜNE | 5.36% |
| KPÖ | 3.57% |

=== Results by constituency ===
| Constituency | SPÖ | | ÖVP | | FPÖ | | Grüne | | KPÖ | | Others | Total seats | Turnout |
| Constituency | % | S | % | S | % | S | % | S | % | S | % | Total seats | Turnout |
|---|---|---|---|---|---|---|---|---|---|---|---|---|---|
| District 1 | 34.2 | 6 | 31.2 | 5 | 12.3 | 2 | 10.3 | 1 | 7.6 | 1 | 4.4 | 15 | 64.4 |
| District 2 | 39.0 | 4 | 40.4 | 4 | 9.9 | 1 | 3.6 | | 2.4 | | 4.7 | 9 | 70.4 |
| District 3 | 30.2 | 3 | 50.3 | 6 | 10.0 | 1 | 4.0 | | 2.3 | | 3.2 | 10 | 74.5 |
| District 4 | 47.6 | 8 | 31.5 | 5 | 10.0 | 1 | 3.3 | | 4.2 | | 3.5 | 14 | 71.0 |
| State seats | | 2 | | 2 | | 1 | | 2 | | 1 | | 8 | |
| Total | 38.3 | 23 | 37.2 | 22 | 10.7 | 6 | 5.6 | 3 | 4.4 | 2 | 4.0 | 56 | 69.5 |
Source: Styrian Government
