= Georg Mayer =

Austrian politician (born 1973)

Georg Mayer MEP
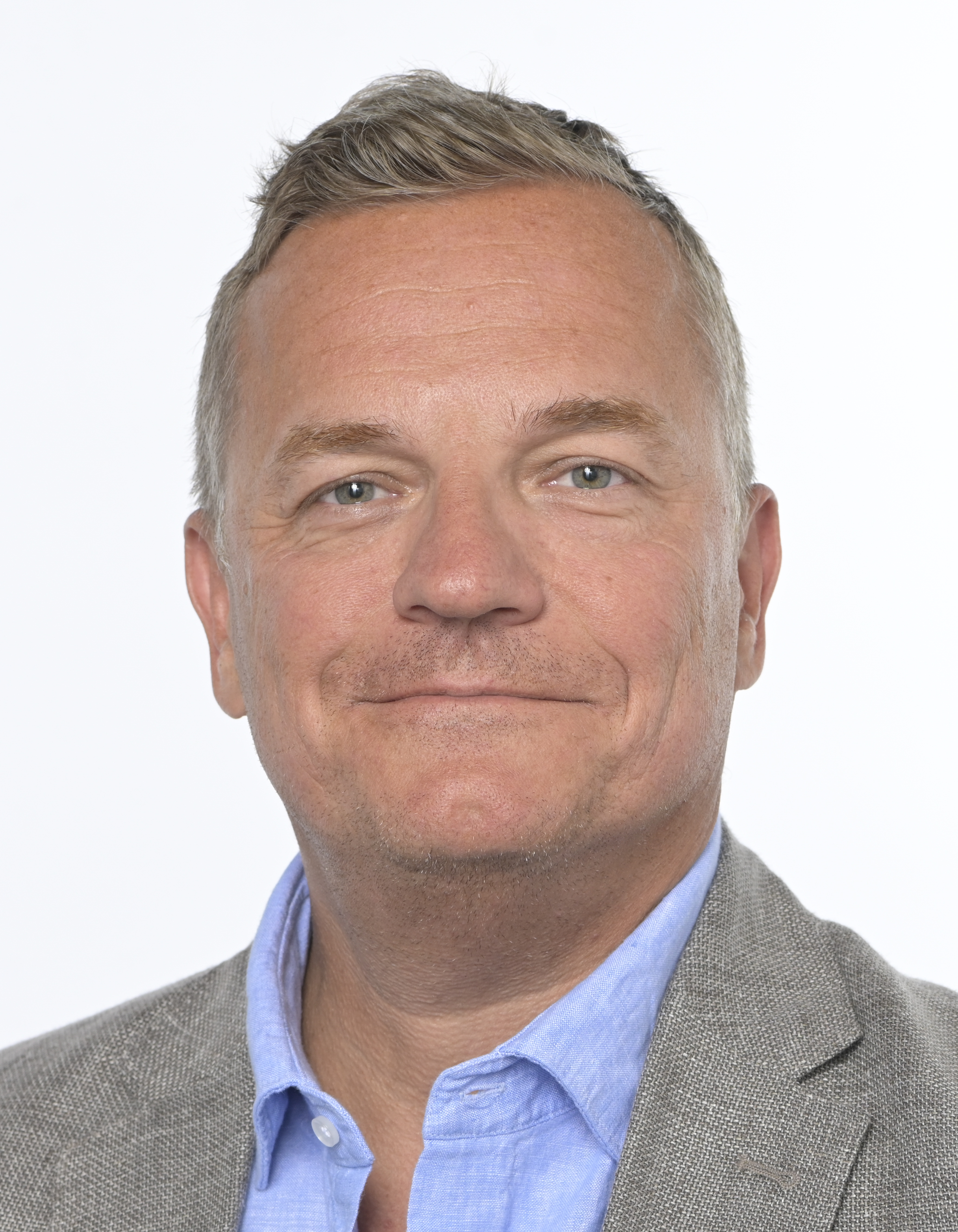

Member of the European Parliament
- Incumbent
- Assumed office 1 July 2014
- Constituency: Austria

Personal details
- Born: 12 October 1973 (age 52) Feldbach, Styria, Austria
- Party: Austrian; Freedom Party of Austria; EU; Patriots.eu

Georg Mayer (born 12 October 1973) is an Austrian politician and Member of the European Parliament (MEP) from Austria. He is a member of the Freedom Party of Austria, part of the Patriots for Europe.

== Early life ==
Mayer was born in Feldbach. After graduating from high school in 1995, he studied business administration and law at the Karl-Franzens University in Graz. In 2001 he obtained his degree, and two years later he completed his doctorate in law. In 2005 he began studying international and European business law at the University of St. Gallen in Switzerland, which he completed in 2007.

After completing his degree, Mayer worked for several months in the office of the non-partisan Minister of Justice Dieter Böhmdorfer before moving to the Federal Ministry for Social Security and Generations under State Secretary Ursula Haubner in June 2002. In January 2005 he became an advisor to Deputy Governor Leopold Schöggl. From autumn 2005 to 2007 he worked as an administrative lawyer in the state of Styria, and from 2007 to 2009 as Secretary General of the European right-wing group ITS in the European Parliament. From 2009 until his election to the Styrian state parliament, Mayer returned to state service.

== Member of the Styrian Landtag ==
In the 2010 elections, Mayer would be elected as a member of the FPÖ to the Styrian state parliament.

== Member of the European Parliament ==
In the 2014 European elections, Mayer would be elected to the European Parliament as third on the FPÖ list, as the FPÖ received 19.7% of the vote and received 4 seats. He would be re-elected in 2019 and 2024.

=== Committees and Delegations ===
==== 10th European Parliament ====
- Committee on Petitions
- Delegation for relations with the countries of the Andean Community
- Delegation to the Euro-Latin American Parliamentary Assembly

==== 9th European Parliament ====
- Committee on Industry, Research and Energy
- Delegation for relations with Iran
- Delegation to the Euro-Latin American Parliamentary Assembly

==== 8th European Parliament ====
- Committee on Transport and Tourism
- Delegation for relations with the countries of South Asia
- Delegation to the Euro-Latin American Parliamentary Assembly
- Committee of Inquiry into Emission Measurements in the Automotive Sector
