= 2005 Styrian state election =

← 2000	2 October 2005	2010 →

All 56 seats in the Landtag of Styria 29 seats needed for a majority All 9 seats in the state government
- Turnout: 708,311 (76.2%) ▲1.5%
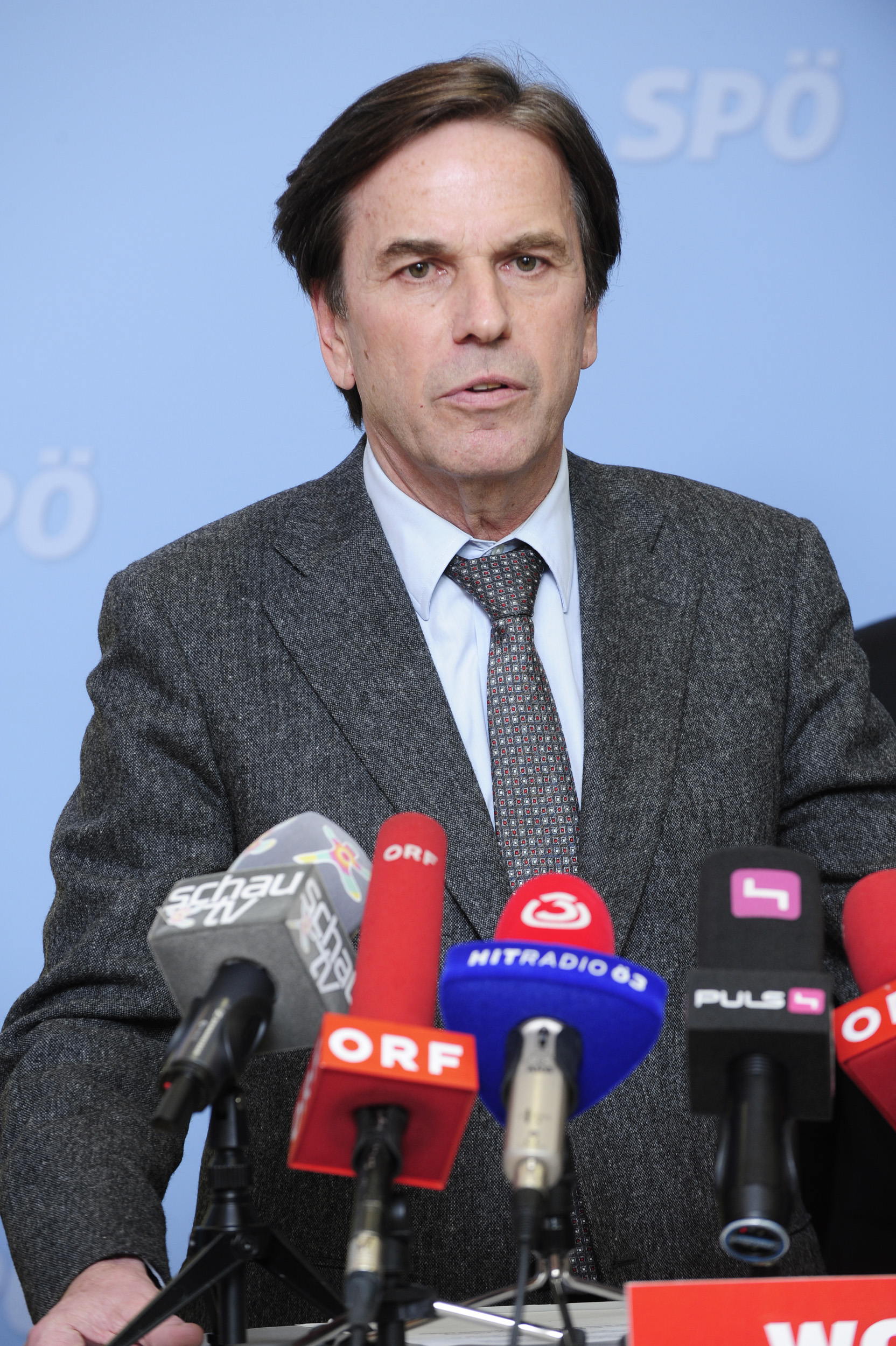

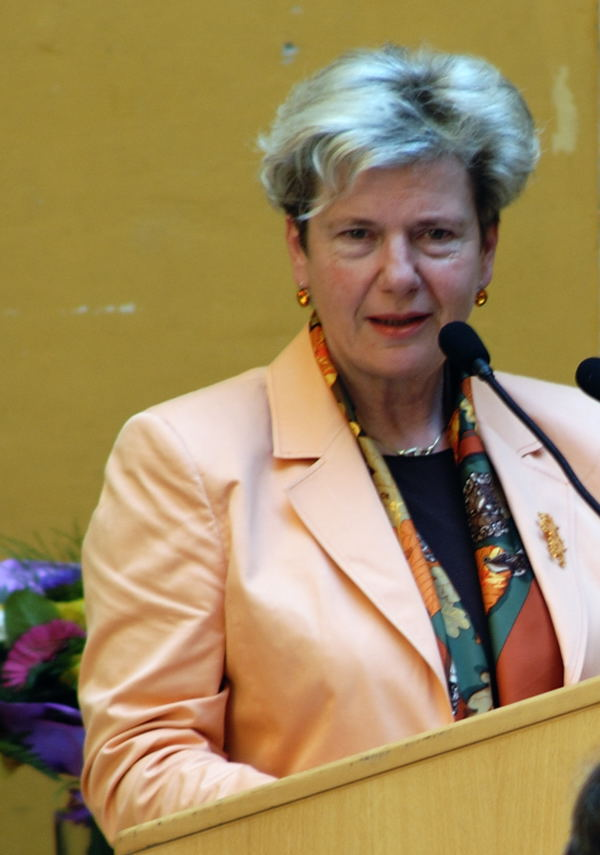

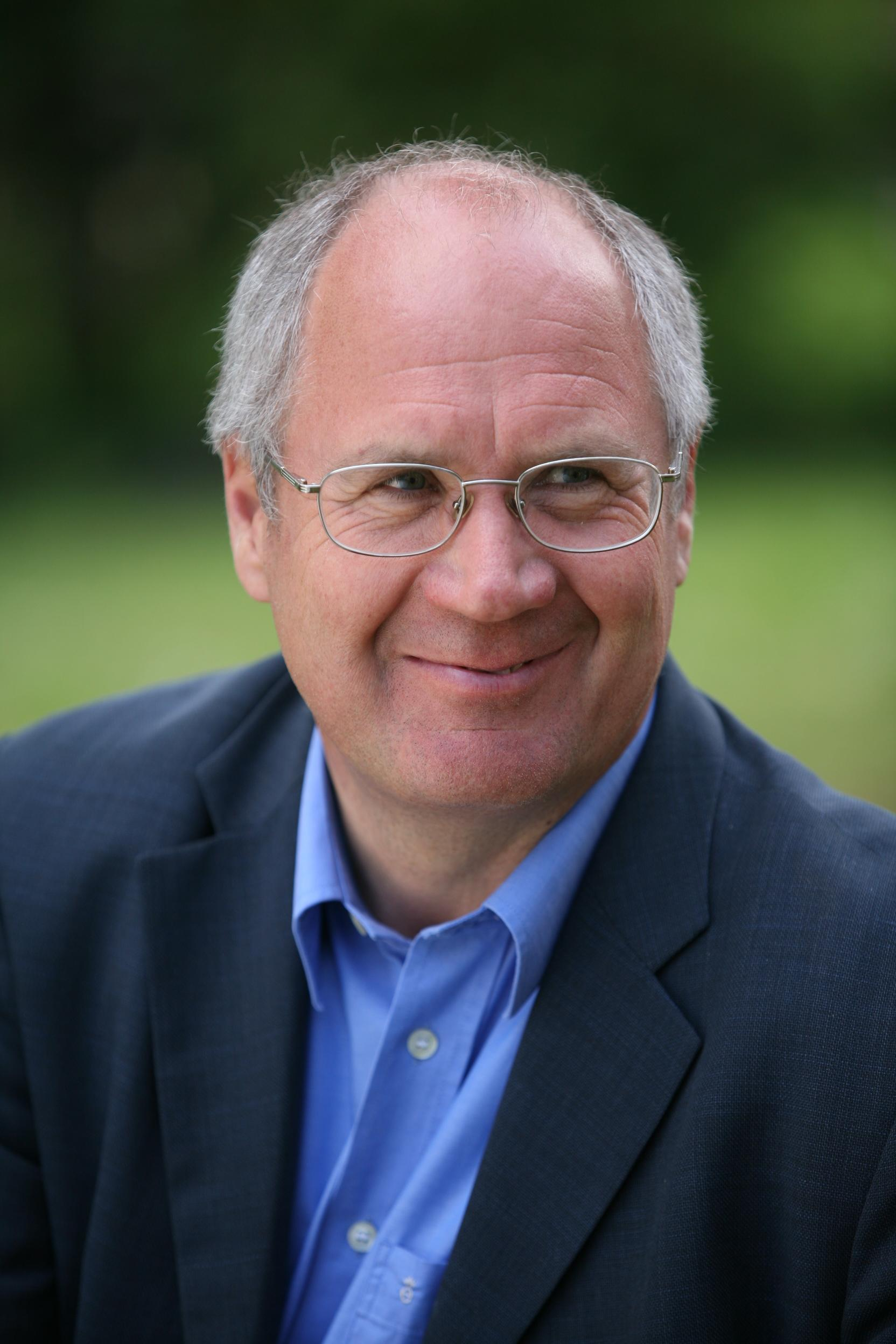
	First party	Second party	Third party
Leader	Franz Voves	Waltraud Klasnic	Ernest Kaltenegger
Party	SPÖ	ÖVP	KPÖ
Last election	19 seats, 32.3%	27 seats, 47.3%	0 seats, 1.0%
Seats won	25	24	4
Seat change	▲6	▼3	▲4
Popular vote	290,859	269,905	44,247
Percentage	41.7%	38.7%	6.3%
Swing	▲9.4%	▼8.6%	▲5.3%
	Fourth party	Fifth party
Party	Greens	FPÖ
Last election	3 seats, 5.6%	7 seats, 12.4%
Seats won	3	0
Seat change	0	▼7
Popular vote	33,013	31,807
Percentage	4.7%	4.6%
Swing	▼0.9%	▼7.8%
Governor before election
Waltraud Klasnic
ÖVP
Elected Governor
Franz Voves
SPÖ

The 2005 Styrian state election was held on 2 October 2005 to elect the members of the Landtag of Styria.

The result was a historic defeat for the Austrian People's Party (ÖVP), who had governed the state uninterrupted since 1945. The Social Democratic Party of Austria (SPÖ) became the largest party on a swing of over nine percentage points. The election was also significant in other ways: the Freedom Party of Austria (FPÖ) lost all its seats for the first time since entering the Landtag in 1949, and suffered its worst result since 1974 in terms of vote share. Conversely, the Communist Party of Austria (KPÖ) returned to the Landtag after a 35-year absence. It became the third largest party with four seats.

SPÖ leader Franz Voves became the new Governor of Styria. Outgoing Governor Waltraud Klasnic sought to remain regional ÖVP leader, but was forced to resign shortly after the election.

== Background ==
Prior to amendments made in 2011, the Styrian constitution mandated that cabinet positions in the state government (state councillors, German: Landesräten) be allocated between parties proportionally in accordance with the share of votes won by each; this is known as Proporz. As such, the government was a perpetual coalition of all parties that qualified for at least one state councillor.

The 2000 election was a decisive victory for the ÖVP, which improved its vote share by eleven points to 47%, falling two seats short of an absolute majority. This was balanced by losses for the SPÖ, FPÖ, and Liberal Forum.

The KPÖ gained national attention after an unexpected record showing in the 2003 local elections in Graz, the capital of Styria, winning 21% and becoming the third largest party in the municipal council. This was attributed to an effective campaign and the popularity of leader Ernest Kaltenegger. The party gained popularity statewide in the aftermath, particularly after Kaltenegger was announced as lead candidate for the 2005 state election.

== Electoral system ==
The 56 seats of the Landtag of Styria were elected via open list proportional representation in a two-step process. 48 of the seats were distributed between four multi-member constituencies. For parties to receive any representation in the Landtag, they must win at least one seat in a constituency directly. Seats were distributed in constituencies according to the Hare quota, with nine leveling seats allocated using the D'Hondt method at the state level, to ensure overall proportionality between a party's vote share and its share of seats.

== Contesting parties ==
Name		Ideology	Leader	2000 result		
Name		Ideology	Leader	Votes (%)	Seats	Councillors
ÖVP	Austrian People's Party; Österreichische Volkspartei	Christian democracy	Waltraud Klasnic	47.3%	27 / 56	5 / 9
SPÖ	Social Democratic Party of Austria; Sozialdemokratische Partei Österreichs	Social democracy	Franz Voves	32.3%	19 / 56	3 / 9
FPÖ	Freedom Party of Austria; Freiheitliche Partei Österreichs	Right-wing populism Euroscepticism	?	12.4%	7 / 56	1 / 9
GRÜNE	The Greens – The Green Alternative; Die Grünen – Die Grüne Alternative	Green politics	?	5.6%	3 / 56	

In addition to the parties already represented in the Landtag, four parties collected enough signatures to be placed on the ballot:

- Communist Party of Austria (KPÖ)
- Hirschmann List (LH)
- Alliance for the Future of Austria (BZÖ)
- Party-free List (Parteifrei)

== Results ==
Party	Votes	%	+/−	Seats	+/−	Coun.	+/−
Social Democratic Party of Austria (SPÖ)	290,859	41.67	+9.35	25	+6	5	+2
Austrian People's Party (ÖVP)	269,905	38.66	–8.64	24	–3	4	–1
Communist Party of Austria (KPÖ)	44,247	6.34	+5.31	4	+4	0	±0
The Greens – The Green Alternative (GRÜNE)	33,013	4.73	–0.88	3	±0	0	±0
Freedom Party of Austria (FPÖ)	31,807	4.56	–7.85	0	–7	0	–1
Hirschmann List (LH)	14,309	2.05	New	0	New	0	New
Alliance for the Future of Austria (BZÖ)	11,977	1.72	New	0	New	0	New
Party-free List (Parteifrei)	1,962	0.28	New	0	New	0	New
Invalid/blank votes	10,232	–	–	–	–	–	–
Total	708,311	100	–	56	0	9	0
Registered voters/turnout	929,795	76.18	+1.54	–	–	–	–
Source: Styrian Government

Popular vote
SPÖ	41.67%
ÖVP	38.66%
KPÖ	6.34%
GRÜNE	4.73%
FPÖ	4.56%
Other	4.05%

Landtag seats
SPÖ	44.64%
ÖVP	42.86%
KPÖ	7.14%
GRÜNE	5.36%

=== Results by constituency ===
Constituency	SPÖ		ÖVP		KPÖ		Grüne		FPÖ		Others	Total seats	Turnout
Constituency	%	S	%	S	%	S	%	S	%	S	%	Total seats	Turnout
District 1	36.1	6	33.6	6	11.2	2	8.6	1	5.1		5.4	15	70.6
District 2	42.4	4	42.9	4	4.4		3.1		3.4		3.8	8	77.9
District 3	32.8	4	51.9	6	3.7		4.9		4.3		3.5	10	80.7
District 4	52.5	9	31.6	5	4.9		2.8		4.9		3.4	14	77.8
State seats		2		3		2		2		–		9	
Total	41.7	25	38.7	24	6.3	4	4.7	3	4.6	0	4.1	56	76.2
Source: Styrian Government
