= Johann Luif =

Austrian Minister of Defense

Minister of Defense
- In office 22 May 2019 – 3 June 2019
- Chancellor: Sebastian Kurz
- Preceded by: Mario Kunasek
- Succeeded by: Thomas Starlinger

Personal details
- Born: 12 July 1959 (age 66) Burgenland, Austria
- Party: Independent

Military service
- Allegiance: Austria
- Branch/service: Bundesheer
- Years of service: 1978–present
- Rank: Lieutenant general

Johann Luif (born 12 July 1959) is an Austrian politician and military officer. From 22 May 2019 – 3 June 2019 he was the Minister of Defense.
