= Christopher Drexler =

Austrian politician (born 1971)

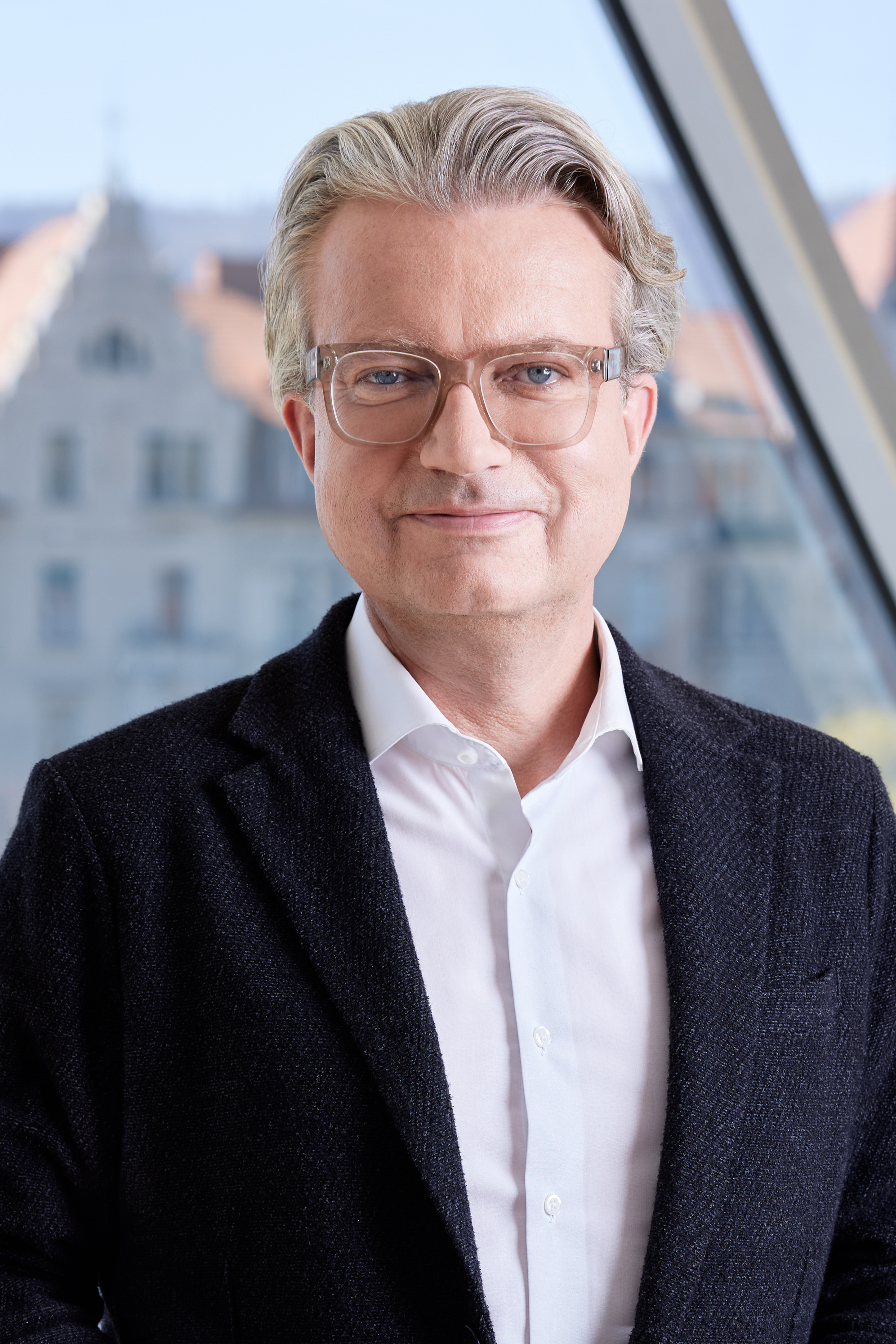

Governor of Styria
- In office 4 July 2022 – 18 December 2024
- Preceded by: Hermann Schützenhöfer
- Succeeded by: Mario Kunasek

Personal details
- Born: 15 March 1971 (age 54); Graz, Austria
- Political party: Austrian People's Party

Christopher Drexler (born 15 March 1971) is an Austrian politician. A member of the Austrian People's Party (ÖVP), he served as the governor of Styria from 2022 until 2024.
