= List of governors of Styria =

This is a list of governors of the Austrian state of Styria:

No.	Portrait	Term				Party	Period
No.	Portrait	Name	Took office	Left office	Duration	Party	Period
1		Wilhelm Kaan	6 November 1918	27 May 1919		Greater German	First Republic (1918–1934)
2		Anton Rintelen	27 May 1919	25 June 1926		Christian Social	First Republic (1918–1934)
3		Franz Prisching	25 June 1926	22 October 1926		Christian Social	First Republic (1918–1934)
4		Alfred Gürtler	22 October 1926	21 May 1927		Christian Social	First Republic (1918–1934)
5		Hans Paul	21 May 1927	23 April 1928		Christian Social	First Republic (1918–1934)
(2)		Anton Rintelen	23 April 1928	10 November 1933		Christian Social	First Republic (1918–1934)
6		Alois Dienstleder	13 November 1933	2 November 1934		Christian Social	First Republic (1918–1934)
7		Karl Maria Stepan	2 November 1934	2 March 1938		Fatherland's Front	Austrofascism
8		Rolph Trummer	3 March 1938	12 March 1938		Fatherland's Front	Austrofascism
(State governor and Gauleiter)							Nazi Germany (1938–1945)
9		Sepp Helfrich	12 March 1938	22 May 1938		NSDAP	Nazi Germany (1938–1945)
10		Siegfried Uiberreither	22 May 1938	8 May 1945		NSDAP	Nazi Germany (1938–1945)
11		Reinhard Machold	8 May 1945	28 December 1945		Social Democratic (SPÖ)	Second Republic (1945–present)
12		Anton Pirchegger	28 December 1945	6 July 1948		People's Party (ÖVP)	Second Republic (1945–present)
Deputy governor Reinhard Machold (SPÖ) filled in from 17 October 1947 to January 1948, when Pirchegger was incapacitated due to ill health.							Second Republic (1945–present)
13		Josef Krainer Sr	6 July 1948	28 November 1971		ÖVP	Second Republic (1945–present)
14		Friedrich Niederl	28 November 1971	4 July 1980		ÖVP	Second Republic (1945–present)
15		Josef Krainer junior	4 July 1980	23 January 1996		ÖVP	Second Republic (1945–present)
16		Waltraud Klasnic	23 January 1996	25 October 2005		ÖVP	Second Republic (1945–present)
17		Franz Voves	25 October 2005	16 June 2015		SPÖ	Second Republic (1945–present)
18		Hermann Schützenhöfer	16 June 2015	4 July 2022		ÖVP	Second Republic (1945–present)
19		Christopher Drexler	4 July 2022	18 December 2024		ÖVP	Second Republic (1945–present)
20		Mario Kunasek	18 December 2024	Incumbent		Freedom Party of Austria (FPÖ)	

== See also ==
- Styria
