= Mario Kunasek =

Austrian politician (born 1976)

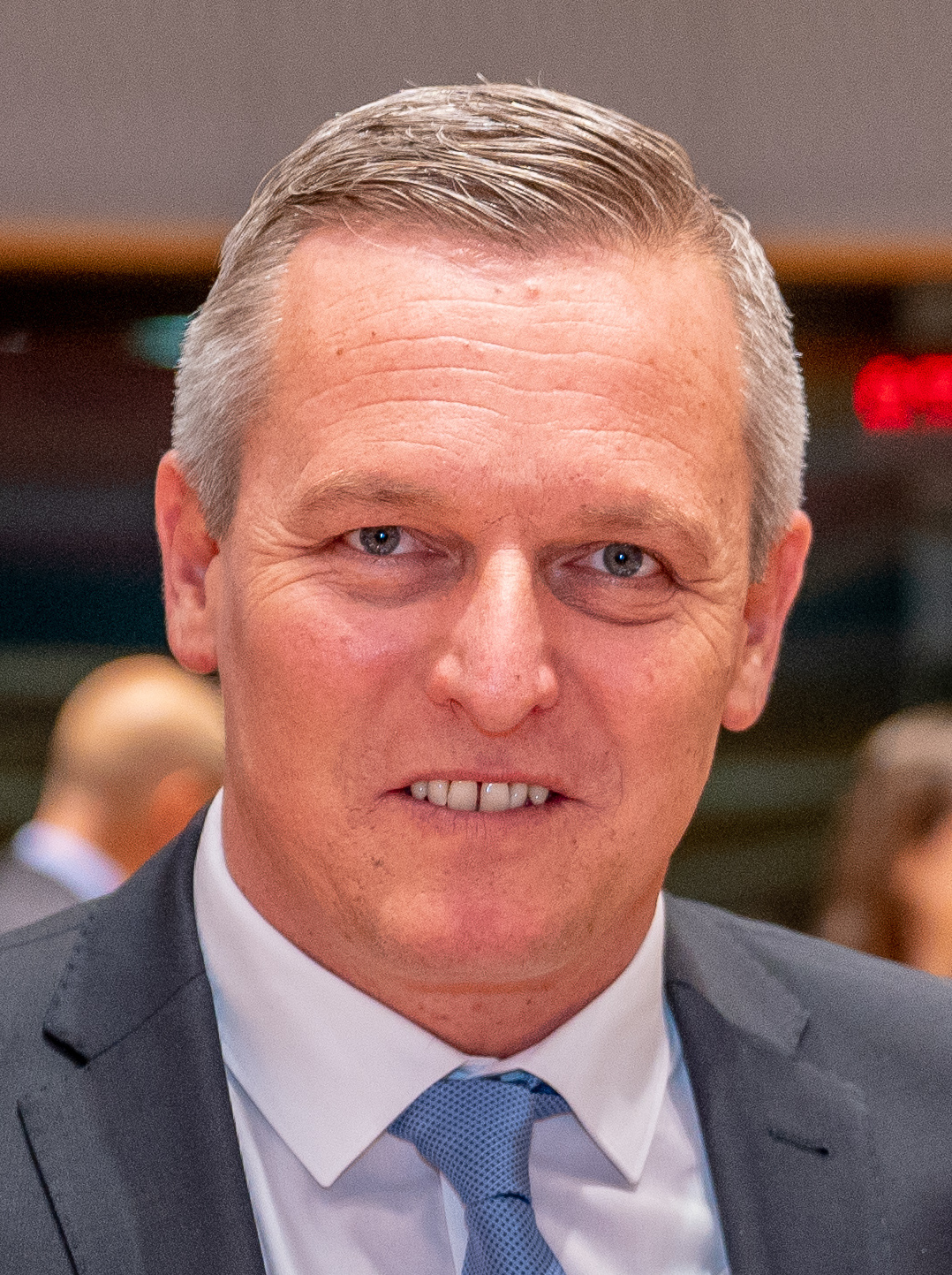
- Kunasek in 2018

Governor of Styria
- Incumbent
- Assumed office 18 December 2024
- Deputy: Manuela Khom
- Preceded by: Christopher Drexler

Minister of Defense
- In office 18 December 2017 – 22 May 2019
- Chancellor: Sebastian Kurz
- Preceded by: Hans Peter Doskozil
- Succeeded by: Johann Luif

Personal details
- Born: 29 June 1976 (age 49) Graz, Styria, Austria
- Party: FPÖ

Military service
- Allegiance: Austria
- Branch/service: Bundesheer
- Years of service: 1995–present
- Rank: Stabsunteroffizier

Mario Kunasek (born 29 June 1976) is an Austrian far-right politician and non-commissioned officer, who is serving as the governor of Styria since December 2024.

From December 2017 until May 2019, he was Federal Minister of National Defense of the Republic of Austria. From May 2019 until December 2024, he was a member of the provincial parliament of Styria, where he served as FPÖ Klubobmann.

== Education and profession ==
After attending compulsory school, Mario Kunasek learned the profession of automotive technician. After completing his military service in St. Michael in 1995, he trained as a non-commissioned officer in Enns and Vienna. Between 1997 and 2005 he was a non-commissioned officer in the supply regiment 1 in Graz. From 2005 he was a Staff Sergeant.

== Political career ==
Mario Kunasek began his political career as a staff representative of AUF-AFH (Aktionsgemeinschaft Unabhängiger und Freiheitlicher, or the Working Group of Independent and Freedom-Loving Members of the Armed Forces). From 2004 to 2006 he was district chairman of the Ring Freiheitlicher Jugend (RFJ) Graz-Umgebung. Since 2005 he has been a member of the provincial party executive of the FPÖ Styria. From 2005 to 2018, he was local party chairman of the FPÖ in his former home municipality of Gössendorf, where he was also a member of the municipal council from 2010 to 2015. After the 2015 municipal elections, he was vice mayor there until December 2017.

At the 2007 provincial party conference, he was elected provincial party secretary of the FPÖ Styria and has since served on the provincial party executive committee. From April 2007 to February 2019, Mario Kunasek was district party chairman of the FPÖ Graz Umgebung. Since 2013, he has been federal party chairman deputy of the FPÖ.

=== Member of the National Council (2008–2015) ===
In the National Council election on 28 September 2008, he ran as the FPÖ's top candidate in the constituency 6B Steiermark Mitte (Graz Umgebung and Voitsberg) and managed to enter parliament for the first time. In the 2013 National Council election, Kunasek was the FPÖ Styria's top candidate and once again entered the National Council as a member of parliament via a basic mandate in the regional constituency of Graz and the surrounding area. He served there as chairman of the National Defense Committee and was defense spokesman for the Freedom Party parliamentary club.

=== Member of the Styrian parliament and club chairman (2015–2017) ===
After the 2015 Styrian state election, in which Kunasek led his party as the FPÖ's top candidate and celebrated the state party's best result to date with 26.76%, he was sworn in as a member of the Styrian state parliament on 16 June 2015. At the same time, he resigned as a member of the National Council. In the Styrian provincial parliament, Kunasek was the chairman of the Freedom Party's provincial parliamentary club until December 2017.

=== Federal Minister for National Defense (2017–2019) ===
After ÖVP and FPÖ made strong gains in the 2017 National Council election, they formed a joint government coalition. Mario Kunasek was nominated by the FPÖ as Minister of Defense and took over the agendas of the Minister of Defense during a ceremonial act at the Federal Ministry of National Defense on 18 December 2017. The Minister of Defense was appointed by the FPÖ.

During his tenure, Kunasek came under the scrutiny of the Economic and Corruption Prosecution Office (WKStA) in March 2019 when he proposed three officers of the Austrian Armed Forces for promotion to the rank of General. Although the candidates were suitable for this appointment according to the evaluation commission, Federal President Alexander Van der Bellen did not sign their certification. Thereafter, the WKStA launched an investigation against Kunasek on suspicion of abuse of office. However, in May 2022, the prosecution finally closed its investigation without any results.

Shortly after the publication of the so-called Ibiza video, Kunasek was re-elected on 20 May 2019 at the provincial party conference of the FPÖ Styria with 99.6% of the delegates' votes as provincial party chairman and nominated as top candidate for the 2019 provincial election. After the dismissal of Interior Minister Herbert Kickl, Mario Kunasek was removed from his ministerial post on 22 May at his own request by Federal President Alexander Van der Bellen. He was succeeded as defense minister by officer Johann Luif in the provisional Löger government until June 2019. In the Bierlein government, Thomas Starlinger held this office until 7 January 2020.

=== Member of the Styrian parliament and club chairman (since 2019) ===
On 28 May 2019, Mario Kunasek returned to Styria as a member of the Styrian state parliament and FPÖ Klubobmann. He was re-commissioned as a member of the Styrian parliament after Anton Kogler resigned his mandate.
