= Hermann Schützenhöfer =

Austrian politician (born 1952)

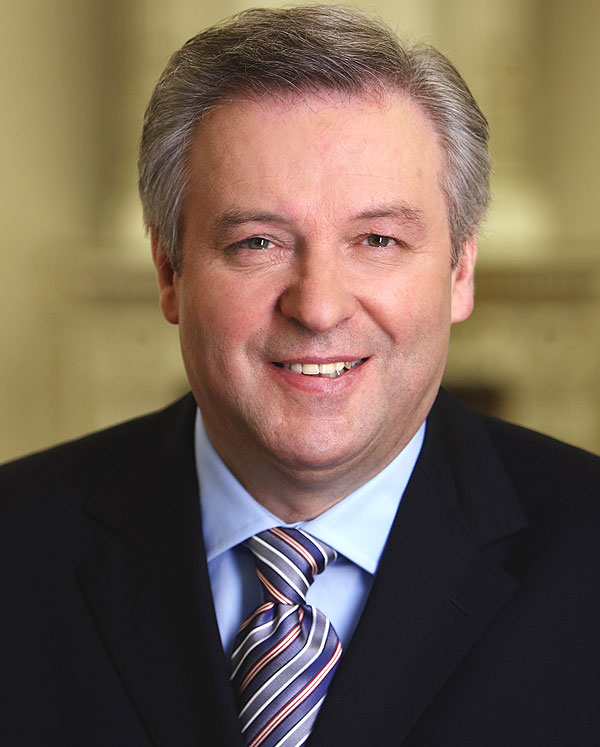

Governor of Styria
- In office 16 June 2015 – 4 July 2022
- Deputy: Anton Lang
- Preceded by: Franz Voves
- Succeeded by: Christopher Drexler

Personal details
- Born: 29 February 1952 (age 74) Edlitz, Austria
- Party: ÖVP (Austrian People's Party)

Hermann Schützenhöfer (pronounced [ˈhɛʁman ˈʃʏtsn̩ˌhøːfɐ]; born 29 February 1952) is an Austrian politician who served as the governor of Styria from 2015 until 2022 and chairman of the Styrian People's Party (StVP/ÖVP) from 2006 until 2022.

== Personal life ==
Schützenhöfer grew up in Edlitz in Lower Austria. In 1966, Schützenhöfer's family moved back to Kirchbach in Styria, where Schützenhöfer completed compulsory school with the polytechnical year. He became an apprentice in a grocery store and wrote articles as a local journalist for the Kleine Zeitung, the Sonntagspost and the Styrian youth magazine Horizont (= "Horizon" - a media organ of the Junge Volkspartei). He is married to Marianne, and has two grown-up children.

== Political activities ==
Schützenhöfer then entered politics in 1970 and became director of the Styrian Young People's Party (JVP) and in 1976 chairman of JVP Styria. In 1978 he acted as director of the ÖAAB (= Workers Union of the People's Party) in Styria. In 2006 he succeeded former governor Waltraud Klasnic as party leader and acted as vice governor. After the Styrian State elections in 2010, Hermann Schützenhöfer and governor Franz Voves of the SPÖ formed the as called "reform partnership coalition" (Reformpartnerschaft). Schützenhöfer again took over the office of the First Deputy Governor in October. There he was also responsible for the areas of personnel agendas, mayors, tourism, folk culture, provincial- and community development.

=== Governor of Styria ===
In June 2015 Schützenhöfer finally became Styrian governor – even though the STVP again had fallen behind the Socialist Party SPÖ by view votes. On 24 November 2019, the People's Party won the Styrian elections with 36.05%; a month later Schützenhöfer again formed a coalition with the SPÖ.

Schützenhöfers most ambitious project was to reshape the structure administration within Styria ("Gemeindestrukturreform") which significantly reduced the numbers of communities and districts. This reform gained much approval but also set off a major controversy. He played a significant role in the process of renewing the Austrian People's Party which also led to the party leadership of Sebastian Kurz.

== Honors ==
- 2016: Senator of Honor at Montanuniversität Leoben
- 2017: Papal Order of St. Gregory the Great
- 2017: Mérite Européen
- 2017: Senator of Honor at Medizinischen Universität Graz
