= Waltraud Klasnic =

Austrian politician (born 1945)

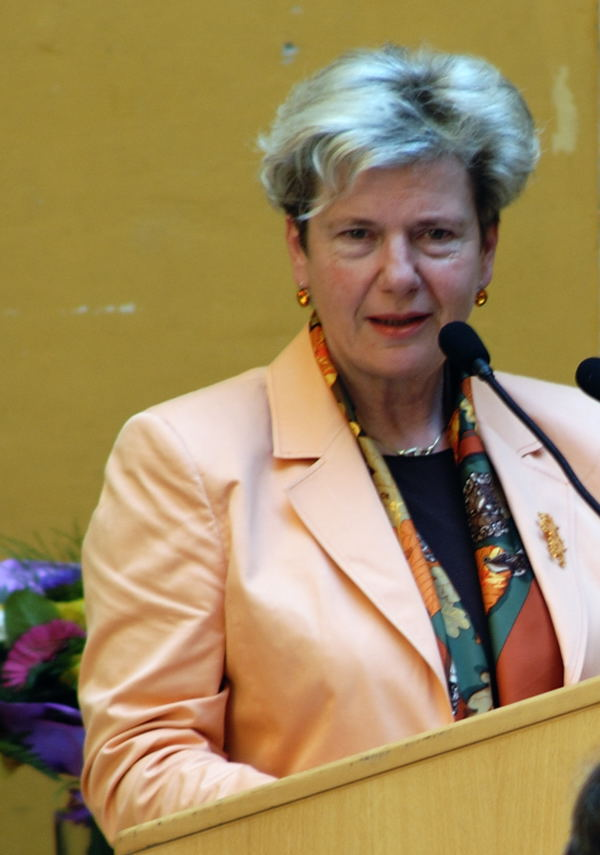
Klasnic speaking in 2004

Waltraud Klasnic (née Tschiltsch, born 27 October 1945) is an Austrian politician who was Landeshauptmann (governor) of Styria from 1996 until 2005.

== Politics ==
Klasnic joined the women's organisation of the Austrian People's Party (ÖVP) in 1970. She was appointed to the Federal Council in 1977, remaining a member until 1981 when she was elected to the Styrian Landtag.

After the previous Landeshauptmann of Styria Josef Krainer junior resigned due to a disappointing election performance, Klasnic was elected as his successor by the Landtag on 23 January 1996. She was the first, and at the time only, female governor of any Austrian state.

Following a loss in the October 2005 Styrian state election Klasnic resigned from the state government. Originally she intended to remain chairperson of the ÖVP in Styria, but lack of support forced her to relinquish this position as well.

Klasnic was considered a possible candidate in the 2010 Austrian presidential election, but she declined to run.

== Personal life ==
Klasnic was born in 1945 in Graz and adopted shortly after birth. She grew up in poor conditions.

In 2010 Klasnic became victims' advocate for the Catholic Church sexual abuse cases in Austria, leading a commission tasked with investigating reported incidents and compensating victims. Critics expressed doubts over her independence because she had been appointed by the Catholic Church.

Klasnic was appointed to a similar role by the Austrian Ski Association (ÖSV) in 2017 after allegations of abuse in the organisation, related to the Me Too movement, were widely publicised.

== Honours ==
- Grand Decoration of Honour in Silver with Sash for Services to the Republic of Austria (2001)
- Dame Grand Cross of the Order of St. Gregory the Great (2002)
- Grand Decoration of Honour in Gold with Sash for Services to the Republic of Austria (2006)
- Grand Cross of the Princely Liechtenstein Order of Merit (2006)
