= Landtag of Styria =

State parliament of Styria, Austria

State Diet of Styria Landtag Steiermark
- 22nd Landtag of Styria
- Established: 1918

Leadership
- President: Gerald Deutschmann, FPÖ

Structure
- Seats: 48
- Political groups: Government (30): FPÖ (17); ÖVP (13); Opposition (18): SPÖ (10); GRÜNE (3); NEOS (3); KPÖ (2)
- Length of term: 5 years

Elections
- Last election: 24 November 2024

Meeting place
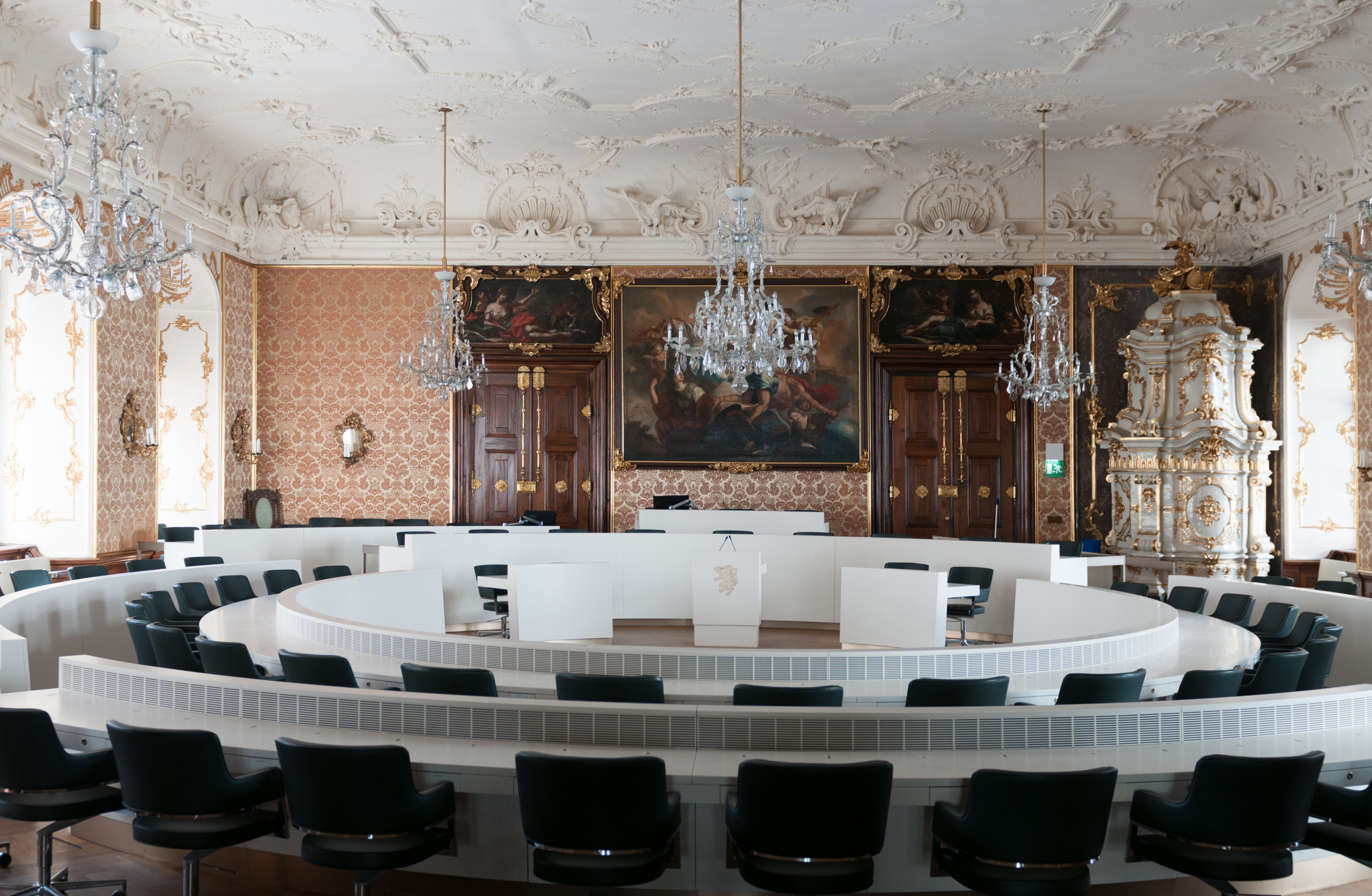
- Grazer Landhaus

The Landtag of Styria (German: Landtag Steiermark) is the elected body of the Austrian state of Styria. The last election of the Landtag was held in 2024. It has 48 seats. The current president of the Landtag is Gerald Deutschmann.
