= Franz Voves =

Austrian politician and ice hockey player

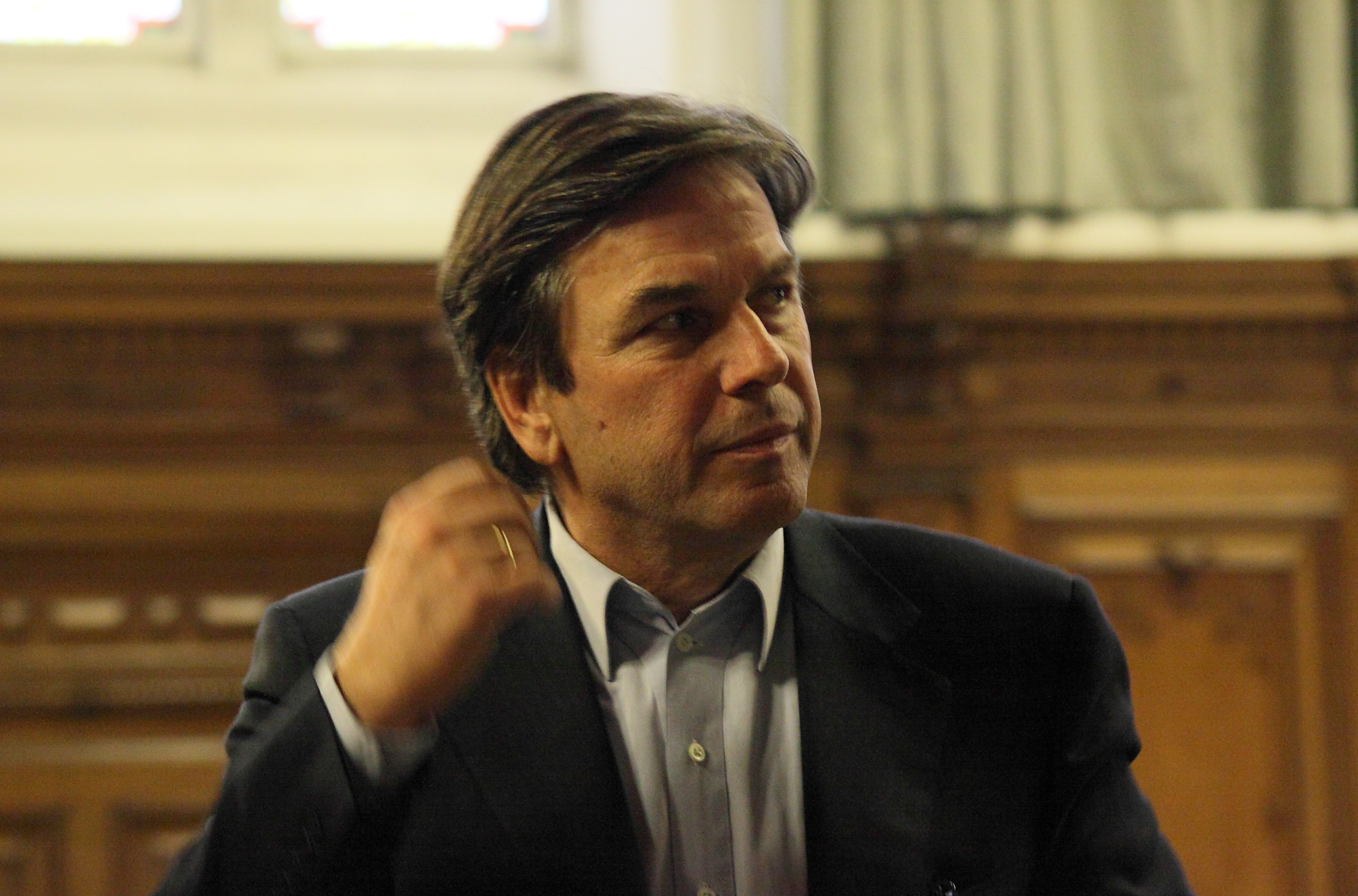

Franz Voves (born 28 February 1953) is an Austrian politician of the SPÖ and a former player in the Austrian ice hockey national team. From 25 October 2005 to 16 June 2015 he has been governor of Styria (Landeshauptmann der Steiermark). He was vice-governor of Styria from 12 March 2002 till 24 October 2005. On 2 March 2002 he was elected as the chairman of the SPÖ Styria (Steiermark).

== Sporting career ==
- 1967–1977: centre for ATSE Graz
- 1975: Austrian Ice Hockey Champion with ATSE Graz
- 1970–1977: 75 games in the Austrian Ice Hockey National Team, participation in 7 Ice Hockey World Championships and the 1976 Winter Olympics in Innsbruck
- Since 1995: president of the ASKÖ-Styria und vice president of the national ASKÖ-Association

== Vocational career ==
- 1972–1978: studies of social science and economics
- 1978: trained as a tax advisor
- 1979–present: in the Merkur Versicherung AG
- 1989–2002: Merkur board member, responsible for the financial sector

== Political career ==
Since 1995, Voves has been a member of the board of the SPÖ in Styria. On 2 March 2002, he became president of the SPÖ Styria and on 12 March he became vice-governor of Styria. In the 2005 elections for the Styrian government, Voves and his party got a majority with 41% of the votes, which was the first time since the Second World War that the SPÖ got a majority in an Austrian state election. On 25 October 2005, 45 of the 56 members of the Styrian federal state parliament (Landtag) voted him governor of Styria, succeeding Waltraud Klasnic. In June 2015 he was succeeded as governor by Hermann Schützenhöfer.
