= Bregman =

Bregman is a surname. Notable people with the surname include:

- Ahron Bregman (born 1958), British-Israeli political scientist, writer and journalist, specialising on the Arab-Israeli conflict
- Albert Bregman (1936–2023), Canadian psychologist, professor emeritus at McGill University
- Alex Bregman (born 1994), American baseball player
- Buddy Bregman (1930–2017), American musical arranger, record producer and composer
- James Bregman (born 1941), member of the first American team to compete in judo in the Summer Olympics
- Kees Bregman (born 1947), Dutch footballer
- Lev M. Bregman (1941–2023), Russian mathematician, most known for the Bregman divergence named after him.
- Maria Bregman (born 1976), Russian-British art critic, literary critic and writer
- Martin Bregman (1926–2018), American film producer and former personal manager
- Myriam Bregman (born 1972), Argentine politician
- Rutger Bregman (born 1988), Dutch historian
- Solomon Bregman (1895–1953), prominent member of the Jewish Anti-Fascist Committee formed in the Soviet Union in 1942
- Tracey E. Bregman (born 1963), German-American soap opera actress

== See also ==
- Bregman divergence or Bregman distance, similar to a metric, but does not satisfy the triangle inequality nor symmetry
- Bregman method, iterative algorithm to solve certain convex optimization problems
- Bing Sings Whilst Bregman Swings, Bing Crosby's sixth long play album, but the first recorded with Verve

== See also ==
- Bergmann
- Bergman
- Breg (disambiguation)
- Brieg (disambiguation)
- Breger
- Brieger
- Breckmann, Breckman
- Brickmann, Brickman
- Briegmann
- Brigman
