= Chief of the General Staff (Austria) =

Top-ranking military officer in the Austrian Armed Forces

- Chef des Generalstabes des Bundesheeres (German)
- Roundel of Austria

- Flag of Austrian general

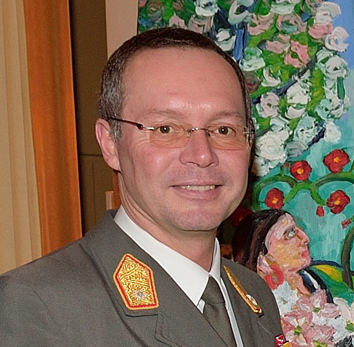
- Incumbent; Rudolf Striedinger since 20 October 2022
- General staff of the Bundesheer; Ministry of Defense
- Style: Mr. Chief of the General Staff (formal)
- Status: Head of a general staff
- Member of: General staff
- Reports to: Minister of Defense
- Seat: Rossauer Barracks, Innere Stadt, Vienna
- Precursor: Chief of the Austro-Hungarian General Staff
- First holder: Rudolf Vidossich as Army Inspector of the Bundesheer (1922)
- Website: Official website

The Chief of the Austrian General Staff (German: Chef des Generalstabes des Bundesheeres) is the highest-ranking military officer in the Austrian Armed Forces and is responsible for maintaining control over the service branches.

== List of chiefs of the general staff ==
=== Army Inspectors (1922–1937) ===
No.	Portrait	Army Inspector	Took office	Left office	Time in office
1	Rudolf Vidossich [de]	Oberstbrigadier; Rudolf Vidossich (1872–1929)	1922	1923	0–1 years
2	Theodor Körner	Major General; Theodor Körner (1873–1957) (Note: Later served as the President of Austria from 1951 to 1957.)	1923	1924	0–1 years
3	Josef Schneider	Major General; Josef Schneider	1924	December 1924	0 years
4	Thomas Buzek	General; Thomas Buzek	January 1925	1926	0–1 years
5	Richard Schilhawsky	General; Richard Schilhawsky (1879–1960)	1926	1929	2–3 years
6	Ludwig von Eimannsberger	General; Ludwig von Eimannsberger (1878–1945)	1929	1930	0–1 years
7	Siegmund Knaus	General of the Infantry; Siegmund Knaus (1879–1971)	1930	1932	1–2 years
8	Sigismund Schilhawsky	General of the Infantry; Sigismund Schilhawsky	1932	1937	4–5 years

=== General Inspector of Troops (1937–1938) ===
No.	Portrait	General Inspector of Troops	Took office	Left office	Time in office
1	Sigismund Ritter Schilhawsky von Bahnbrück	General of the Infantry; Sigismund Ritter Schilhawsky von Bahnbrück (1881–1957)	1937	12 March 1938	0–1 years

=== Chiefs of the General Staff (1936–1938) ===
No.	Portrait	Chief of the General Staff	Took office	Left office	Time in office
1	Alfred Jansa	Lieutenant field marshal Alfred Jansa (1884–1963) (Note: Dismissed according to paragraph 8 of the Berchtesgaden agreement of 12 February 1938.)	1 April 1936	12 February 1938	1 year, 317 days
2	Franz Böhme	Major General; Franz Böhme (1885–1947) (Note: Appointed according to paragraph 8 of the Berchtesgaden agreement of 12 February 1938.)	12 February 1938	12 March 1938	28 days

=== General Inspectors of Troops (1956–2002) ===
No.	Portrait	General Inspectors of Troops	Took office	Left office	Time in office
1	Erwin Fussenegger [de]	General; Erwin Fussenegger (1908–1986)	31 August 1956	16 December 1970	14 years, 107 days
2	Otto Seitz [de]	General of the Infantry; Otto Seitz (1911–1974)	1 January 1971	30 November 1971	349 days
3	Anton Leeb [de]	General of the Infantry; Anton Leeb (1913–2008)	30 November 1971	31 December 1977	6 years, 31 days
4	Hubert Wingelbauer [de]	General of the Infantry; Hubert Wingelbauer (1915–1987)	1 January 1978	31 December 1980	3 years, 0 days
5	Heinz Scharff [de]	General; Heinz Scharff (1920–2014)	1 January 1981	31 December 1986	6 years, 0 days
6	Othmar Tauschitz [de]	General; Othmar Tauschitz (1925–2022)	1 January 1987	1 October 1990	4 years, 273 days
7	Karl Majcen [de]	General; Karl Majcen (born 1934)	1 October 1990	20 December 1999	9 years, 80 days
8	Horst Pleiner [de]	General; Horst Pleiner (born 1941)	1 January 2000	1 December 2002	2 years, 334 days

=== Chiefs of the General Staff (2002–present) ===
No.	Portrait	Chief of the General Staff	Took office	Left office	Time in office	Ref.
1	Roland Ertl [de]	General; Roland Ertl (born 1945)	1 December 2002	30 November 2007	4 years, 364 days	—
2	Edmund Entacher [de]	General; Edmund Entacher (born 1949)	30 November 2007	24 January 2011	3 years, 55 days	—
–	Othmar Commenda	Lieutenant General; Othmar Commenda (born 1954); Acting	24 January 2011	7 November 2011	287 days	
(2)	Edmund Entacher [de]	General; Edmund Entacher (born 1949)	7 November 2011	23 March 2013	1 year, 136 days	
3	Othmar Commenda	General; Othmar Commenda (born 1954)	22 May 2013	24 July 2018	5 years, 63 days	
4	Robert Brieger	Major general Robert Brieger (born 1955)	24 July 2018	6 May 2022	3 years, 286 days	
5	Rudolf Striedinger	Major general Rudolf Striedinger (born 1961)	20 October 2022	29 September 2026	3 years, 344 days	
6	Harald Vodosek [de]	General; Harald Vodosek	29 September 2026	Incumbent	5 days	

== See also ==
- Austro-Hungarian General Staff
- Supreme Commander of the Imperial and Royal Armed Forces
