= Brzeg (disambiguation) =

Brzeg is a town in Opole Voivodeship, south-west Poland.

Brzeg may also refer to:

- Brzeg Dolny, a town in Lower Silesian Voivodeship (south-west Poland)
- Brzeg, Poddębice County in Łódź Voivodeship (central Poland)
- Brzeg, Gmina Rzeczyca, Tomaszów County in Łódź Voivodeship (central Poland)

== See also ==
- Brieg (disambiguation)
