= Johann Frank =

Johann Frank may refer to:

- Johann Frank (footballer) (1938 – 2010), Austrian football player and coach
- Johann Frank (general) (born 1969) is an officer of the Austrian Armed Forces and political scientist

== See also ==
- Johann Franck (1618 – 1677), German politician, lyric poet and hymnist
- Johann Frank Kirchbach (1859 – 1912), German historical-, portrait-, genre- and landscape-painter, graphic designer and illustrator
- Johann Peter Frank (1745 – 1821), German physician and hygienist
