= Johann Frank (general) =

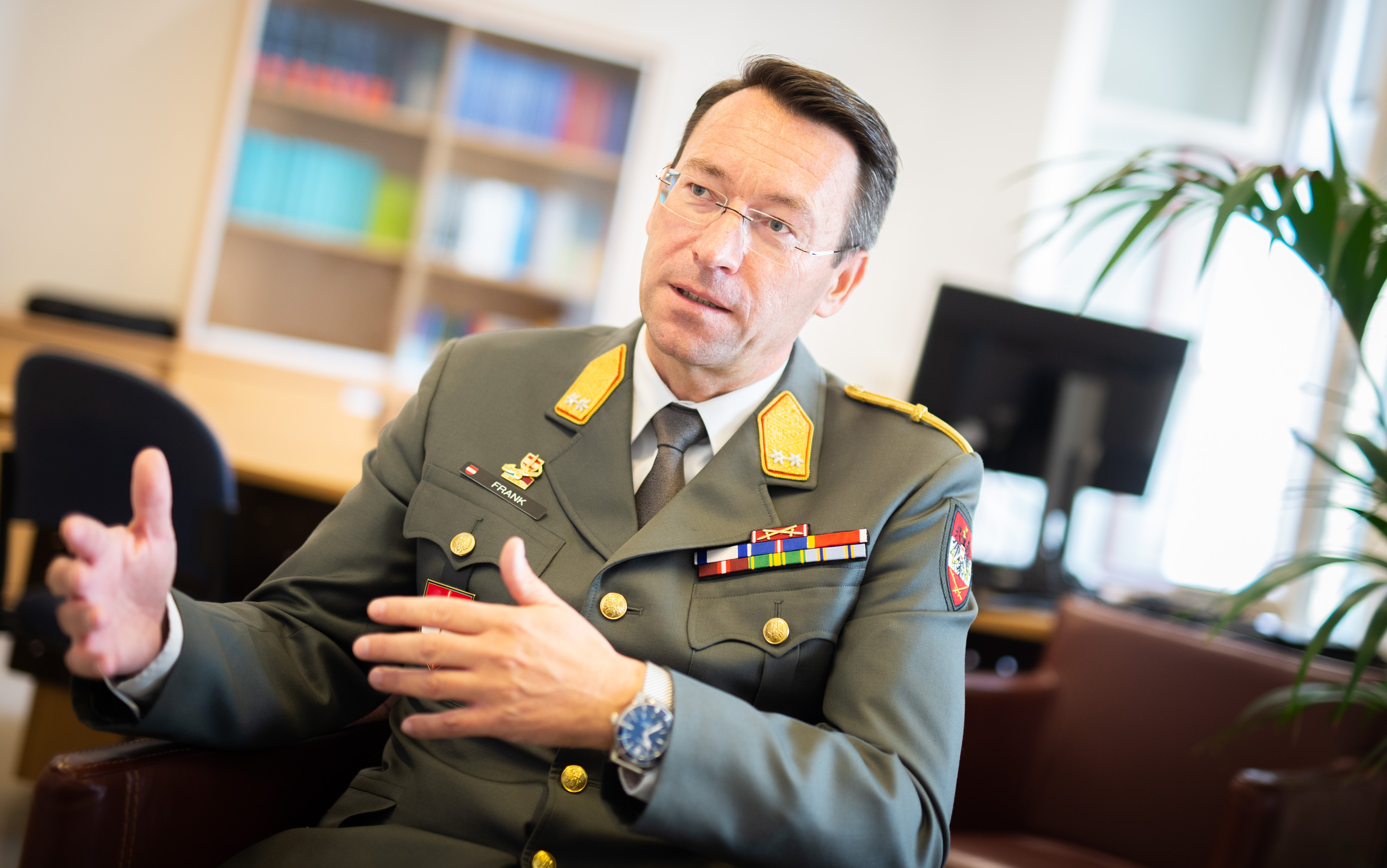
Major General Johann Frank (2020)

Johann Frank (born 6 November 1969 in Leoben, Austria) is a Major General of the Austrian Armed Forces. Major General Frank is the Austrian Military Representative to EU and NATO. From 2022 to 2025 he held the position of Director Cabinet of the Chairman of the European Union Military Committee. In this capacity he supported Chairman General Robert Brieger. Main achievements of this periode were amongst others the establishment of an EU training mission for Ukraine, so far the biggest military mission of the EU, the activation of European Union Naval Force ASPIDES in the Red Sea as the first-ever maritime operation of the EU in a non-permissive environment, the declaration of full-operational capability of the EU Rapid Deployment Capacity (RDC) and expanding traditional crisis management oriented capability planning of the EU by including also aspects for territorial defence. From 2020 to 2022, he was director of the Institute for Peace Support and Conflict Management at the National Defence Academy in Vienna. From 2014 to 2020, he held the position of Security policy director at the Federal Ministry of Defence (in Austria: BMLV) and was a permanent member of the National Security Council (NSC) and the council for integration and foreign policy (German: Rat für Integration und Außenpolitik, RIA).

== Career ==
Frank graduated from the military secondary school (German: Militärrealgymnasium) in Wiener Neustadt in 1988 and attended the Theresian Military Academy from 1989 to 1992. He became a company commander and teaching officer at the CBRN Defence School of the Austrian Armed Forces, followed by the appointment as deputy head of the CBRN Defence School in 1998. In 1999, he moved to the military policy area in the Austrian Federal Ministry of Defence. After working in the Security Policy Department of the Federal Chancellery, he was promoted to head of the Office for Security Policy in the Federal Ministry of Defence in 2008.

He was appointed as head of the Security Policy Directorate and Defence Policy Director of the Federal Ministry of Defence in 2014 and promoted to Major General (MG).

During this time, he was instrumental in the conception of fundamental Austrian strategy documents such as the Austrian Security Strategy and the National Defence Sub-Strategy. He paid special attention to deepening regional defence cooperation. Frank was active in establishing the Central European Defence Cooperation (CEDC), in which Austria, the Czech Republic, Slovakia, Hungary, Slovenia and Croatia participate. In addition, Frank particularly supported the ambition of bringing the Western Balkan states closer to the European Union (EU) and the security policy engagement of the Federal Ministry of Defence in West Africa.

In 2018, Frank took over the management of the BMLV's (i.e. MoD's) internal coordination of the Austrian EU Council Presidency, having already served as Austria's high-ranking representative at EU meetings through his function as Security Policy director.

As director of the Institute for Peace Support and Conflict Management at the National Defence Academy, his main areas of work were the increased orientation of the institute towards policy advisory tasks, the expansion of China expertise and basic research in the field of intellectual defence (German: “Geistige Landesverteidigung”).

Frank received his doctorate in political science from the University of Vienna in 2002. From 2007 to 2009 he completed the Master of Advanced Studies Security Policy and Crisis Management at the ETH Zurich.

He has also participated in international security policy courses and training, including the Senior Executive Course in National and International Security at the Harvard Kennedy School, as well as at RAND and the European Security and Defence College (ESDC).

In 2008 and 2013, Frank was a lecturer on international and European security policy at the Karl Franzens University in Graz.

Johann Frank is married to Iris Frank and father of two children.

== Memberships ==
- Austrian Academy of Sciences
- Corresponding Member of the Scientific Advisory Board of the European Forum Alpbach
- International Institute for Strategic Studies (IISS)
- Science Commission at the BMLV (i.e. Austrian MoD)

== Publications ==
- List of all publications (as editor and author) by Major General Frank within the framework of the Austrian MoD
- From 2010 to 2014, Frank was editor of the series "Sicherheit und Strategie" (i.e. Security and Strategy).
- Since 2015, he has been editor of the "Sicherheitspolitische Jahresvorschau" (i.e. Annual Security Policy Forecast) of the Austrian Ministry of Defence:

*Sicherheitspolitische Jahresvorschau 2015
*Sicherheitspolitische Jahresvorschau 2016
*Sicherheitspolitische Jahresvorschau 2017
*Sicherheitspolitische Jahresvorschau 2018
*Sicherheitspolitische Jahresvorschau 2019
*Sicherheitspolitische Jahresvorschau 2020
*Sicherheitspolitische Jahresvorschau 2021
*Risikolandschaft Österreich 2022 (Sicherheitspolitische Jahresvorschau 2022)
