= Othmar Commenda =

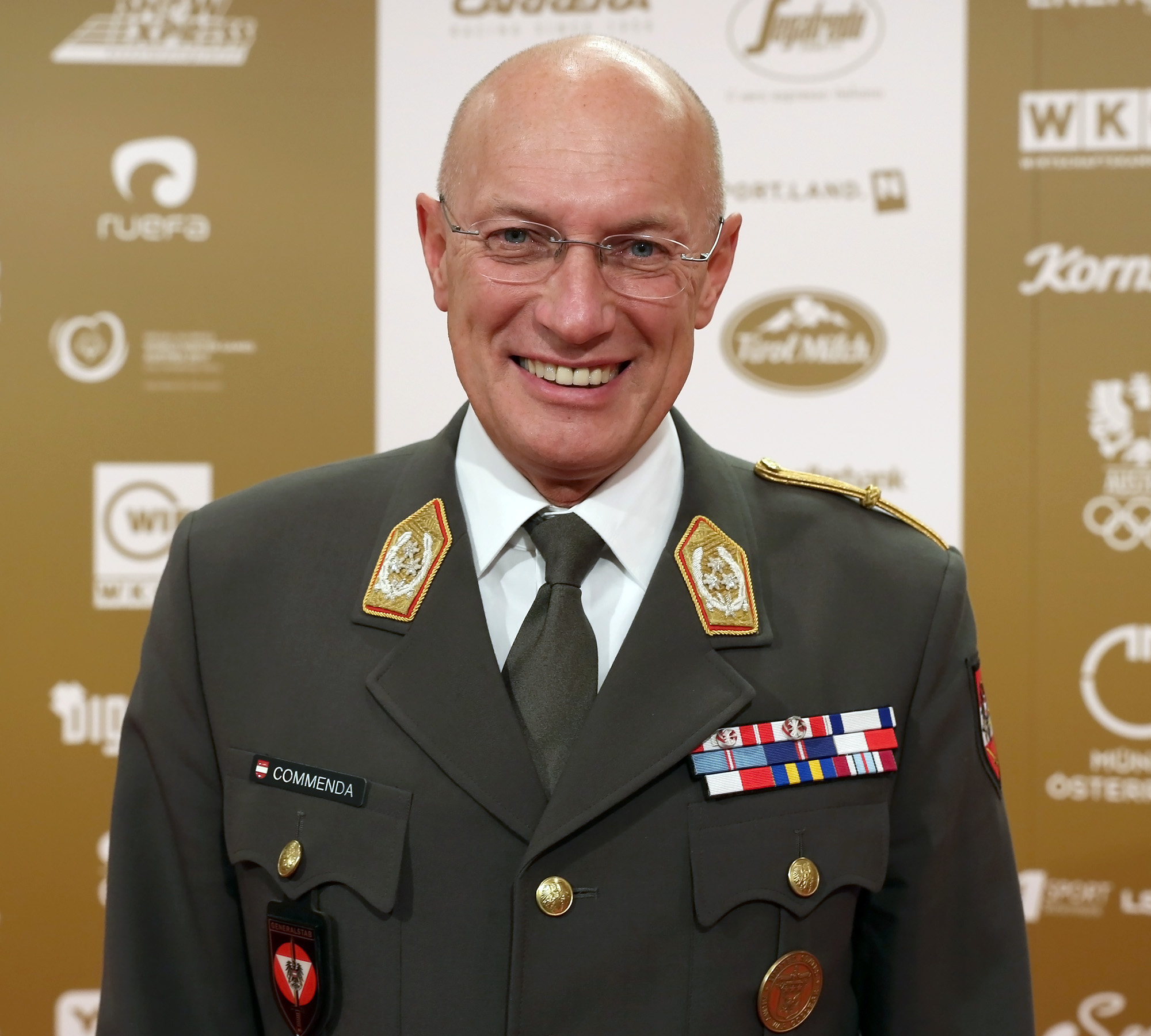

Chief of the General Staff
- In office May 2013 – 24 July 2018
- Minister: Hans Peter Doskozil
- Preceded by: Edmund Entacher
- Succeeded by: Robert Brieger

Personal details
- Born: 29 May 1954 (age 71) Wels

Othmar Commenda (born 29 May 1954) is a retired General of the Austrian Armed Forces and former Chief of its General Staff.

== Career ==
After his basic military service in 1975, he graduated at the Theresian Military Academy. He was from 1979 Platoon leader and then as company commander at Panzerbataillon 14 in Wels in service.

Later Commenda graduated at the National Defense Academy in Vienna a general staff training, which he completed in 1988 with honors. from 1988 to 1991, Commenda was the chief instructor of tactics at the National Defense Academy.

From 1993 to 1995 he was chief of staff and deputy brigade commander of the 3rd Panzer-Grenadier-Brigade in Mautern.

As of 2001, Commenda was head of the staff department in the Cabinet of Defense, and since 2003 has been in charge of the Cabinet of the Federal Minister of Defense.

From May 2013 to the end of June 2018 he was chief of the general staff. Following this, he was promoted to the rank as general. As chief of the general staff, Robert Brieger followed in July 2018.
