= Rudolf Striedinger =

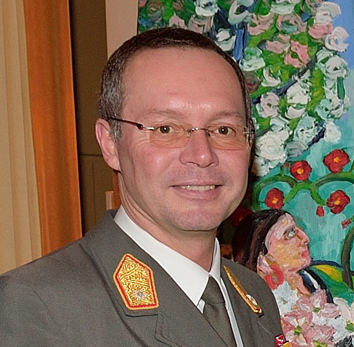
Striedinger in 2013.

Rudolf Striedinger (born September 26, 1961, in Wiener Neustadt) is an Austrian Bundesheer general who has since October 20, 2022 been Chief of the General Staff of the Austrian Armed Forces.

== Life ==
Striedinger was born on September 26, 1961, in Wiener Neustadt, Lower Austria. After graduating from the Theresianum in Vienna in 1979 and completing his basic military service in 1980 as a one-year volunteer, he undertook officer training at the Theresian Military Academy in Wiener Neustadt, where he was commissioned as a lieutenant in 1983 and assigned as a rifle officer to the 32nd Landwehr Regiment in Korneuburg, where he served as a training officer. From 1984 to 1987, he served as a company commander in a rifle company, as commander of the headquarters company of a regiment, and as operations officer of various militia battalions. From 1988 to 1991, he completed the 12th General Staff Course at the National Defence Academy Ministry of Defence in Vienna, graduating at the top of his class. From 1991 until autumn 1994, he served an operations officer and Deputy Chief of Staff at the Vienna Military Command. Subsequently, Striedinger was the officer responsible for personnel, command, and coordination matters at the Federal Ministry of Defence and commanded the Academic Battalion at the Theresian Military Academy, as well as being responsible for the General Staff Office at the Federal Ministry. Until 1998, he also served as Chief of Staff of the 2nd Mobile Rifle Brigade. He was appointed head of the General Staff Office in 2002 and promoted to Brigadier in 2004.

== High command posts ==
From May 28, 2006, to December 1, 2006, Striedinger commanded a multinational task force under European Union Force Bosnia and Herzegovina. From May 26, 2011, to February 2016, he was the military commander of Lower Austria. In March 2016, Striedinger was appointed by Defense Minister Hans Peter Doskozil as the new head of the Defense Intelligence Agency and succeeded Defense Minister Klaudia Tanner appointed Striedinger as her Chief of Staff in January 2020. From July 2021, Striedinger served as Head of the General Staff Directorate and Deputy Chief of the General Staff. On August 17, 2022, Tanner appointed Striedinger as the new Chief of the General Staff, succeeding General Robert Brieger, who had been serving as Chairman of the European Union Military Committee since May 2022. On October 20, 2022, Striedinger officially assumed his post as Chief of the General Staff of the Austrian Armed Forces at a military ceremony in the Maria Theresa Barracks.

== Personal life ==
Striedinger has been married twice and is the father of six children. He lives in Sierndorf. He is a member of the Austrian Veterans' Association – Lower Austria State Association and from 2014 to 2016, he was President of the Austrian Society for the Protection of Cultural Property and a board member of the Austrian National Committee of Blue Shield International. In October 2015, he became Vice President of the Austrian Officers' Society, resigning with his appointment as Chief of the General Staff.

== Awards ==
- Decoration of Honour for Services to the Republic of Austria
- Military Service Badge, 3rd Class
- Military Service Medal in Bronze
- Merit Badge, 1st Class, of the Austrian Federal Fire Brigade Association in Gold (2012)
- Silver Commander's Cross of the Decoration of Honour for Services to the Federal State of Lower Austria (2016)
- Grand State Decoration of Honour in Gold of the Austrian Veterans' Association – Lower Austria State Association
