= Brieger =

Brieger is a surname. Notable people with the surname include:

- Friedrich Gustav Brieger (1900–1985), German-born Brazilian botanist
- Käthe Brieger (1894–1973), German psychologist and educator
- Pedro Brieger (born 1955), Argentine journalist and sociologist
- Peter H. Brieger (1898–1983), German art historian
- Robert Brieger (born 1956), Austrian Armed Forces General
