= Ludwig von Eimannsberger =

Austrian general

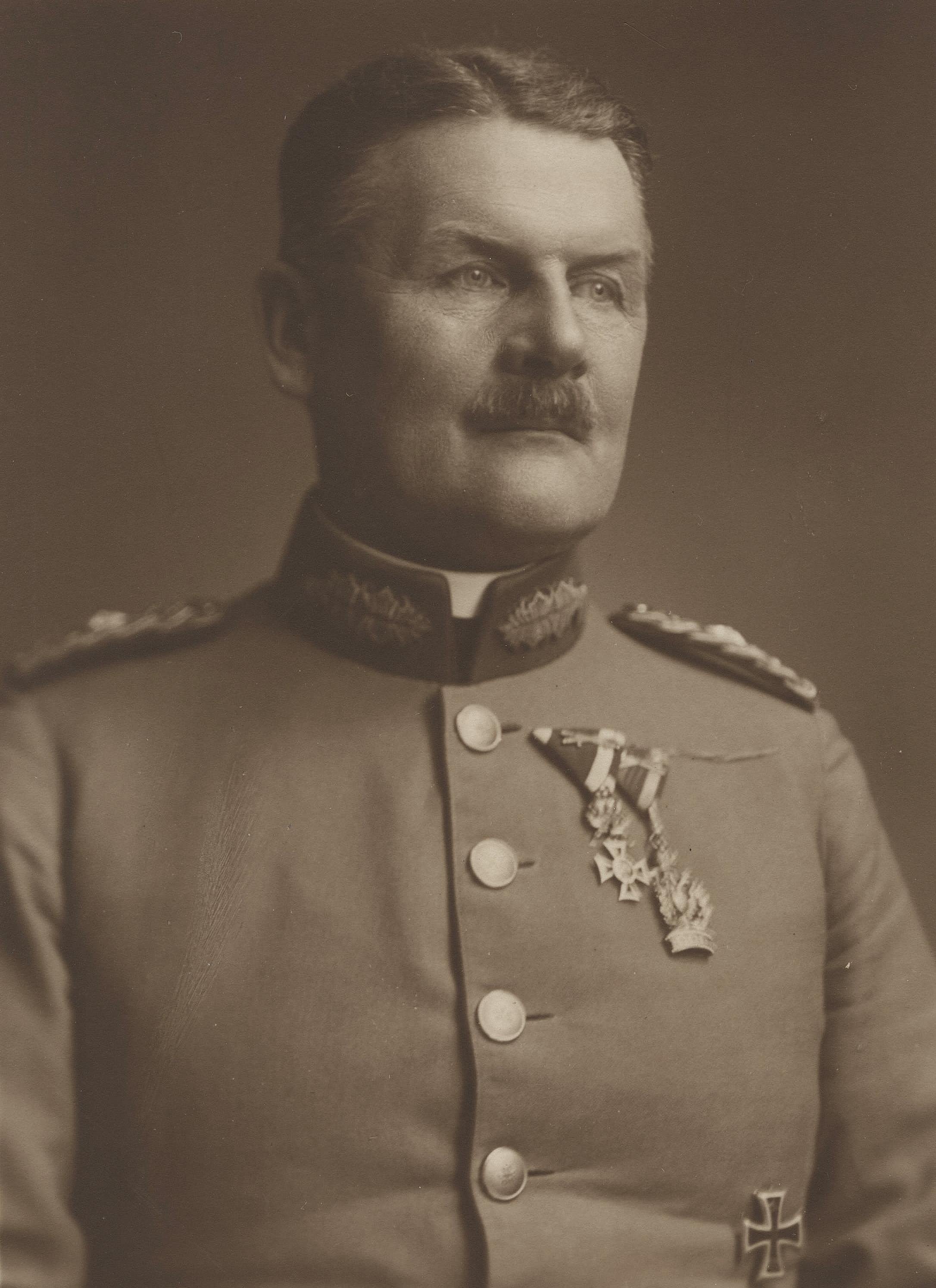
- Born: Ludwig Alfred Ritter von Eimannsberger; 19 November 1878; Vienna, Austro-Hungarian Empire
- Died: 31 July 1945 (aged 66) Innsbruck, Allied-occupied Austria
- Allegiance: Austria-Hungary (1895-1918); Austria (1918-1938); Nazi Germany (1938-1943)
- Branch: Austro-Hungarian Army; Bundesheer; German Army
- Service years: 1895-1930 (Austria); 1938-1943 (Germany)
- Rank: Inspector of the Army (Austria); General of the Artillery (Germany)
- Conflicts: World War I World War II

Ludwig Alfred von Eimannsberger or Ludwig Ritter von Eimannsberger (19 November 1878 – 31 July 1945) was a General of the Artillery and army inspector of the Bundesheer of the First Austrian Republic as well as a strategist and an early pioneer and advocate of armoured warfare and the use of large armoured formations in combined arms combat.

== Early life and First World War ==
Ludwig Alfred von Eimannsberger was the only son of Major Ludwig Matthäus Eimannsberger from Vienna and his wife Ernestine, daughter of Major General Robert von Kutschenbach (also spelt Kutzschenbach) regimental commander of the Imperial and Royal (German: kaiserlich und königlich, typically abbreviated as k.u.k.) 8th Uhlan Regiment (Count Auersperg). Ludwig Matthäus was a professional officer and would eventually serve with the k.u.k 52nd Infantry Regiment (Archduke Friedrich). He would serve on the general staff of the regiment and as a general teacher and would take part in the Second Italian War of Independence, Austro-Prussian War and the Austro-Hungarian campaign in Bosnia and Herzegovina in 1878. During the campaign in Bosnia, he was shot through the chest in the street fighting that marked the campaign in Sarajevo on 19 August 1878 and succumbed to his injury on 4 September. His death in action had him posthumously awarded the Order of the Iron Crown III Class with War Decorations on 20 October 1878. By that award, his widow, Ernestine, had the right to apply for tax-free elevation to the hereditary knighthood, which she did on 28 June 1880. The request was granted on 14 September 1880 by the highest resolution.

Ernestine Eimannsberger and her son Ludwig Alfred were thus raised to the peerage and from then on belonged to the Austro-Hungarian class of untitled nobility. Ernestine, who had grown up in the officer's milieu and lived according to an iron line would send her 10-year-old son Ludwig Alfred to the military secondary school in St. Pölten and from there to the Imperial and Royal Technical Military Academy where Eimannsberger was mustered out in 1899 to the 11th Field Artillery Regiment stationed in Budapest. From 1903 to 1905, he completed a course from the Kriegsschule and then joined the command of artillery directors in Sarajevo and Przemyśl as a general staff officer, where he and his wife Charlotte, the daughter of the Imperial-Royal Landwehr Major General Ludwig Vetter von Bruckthal, the regiment commander of the 8th Bohemian Dragoons (Count Montecuccoli's), lived.

In 1910, his first-born son, Ludwig Karl, was born in Przemyśl. Following the family tradition, Ludwig Karl would become a professional officer in the Austro-Hungarian Army and later the Wehrmacht by serving as the 1st General Staff Officer in the 3rd Mountain Division on the Eastern Front and ultimately by holding the rank of colonel. After the birth of his first son, Eimannsberger would become the captain of the artillery staff and teacher of artillery fire and weapons theory at the Imperial and Royal Technical Military Academy in Mödling.

Upon the outbreak of the First World War, he joined the XII Corps stationed in Transylvania as an artillery officer. He took part in the campaigns in Eastern Galicia and Russian Poland and contributed to the capture of the Russian fortress of Ivangorod in 1915.

In the summer of 1916, he was an artillery commander with the Kaiserschützen Division in South Tyrol and then an artillery advisor with the XV Corps Command on the Upper Isonzo, where he earned great merit for the breakthrough at Karfreit in October 1917, which earned him the Knight's Cross of the Austrian Imperial Order of Leopold.

After the war, his daughter Margarete would be born in 1918 and then his second son Robert in 1919; the latter was called up in 1939 as a student at the Technical University in Vienna and would be killed on 10 January 1943 as a first lieutenant in the 44th Infantry Division during the Battle for Stalingrad.

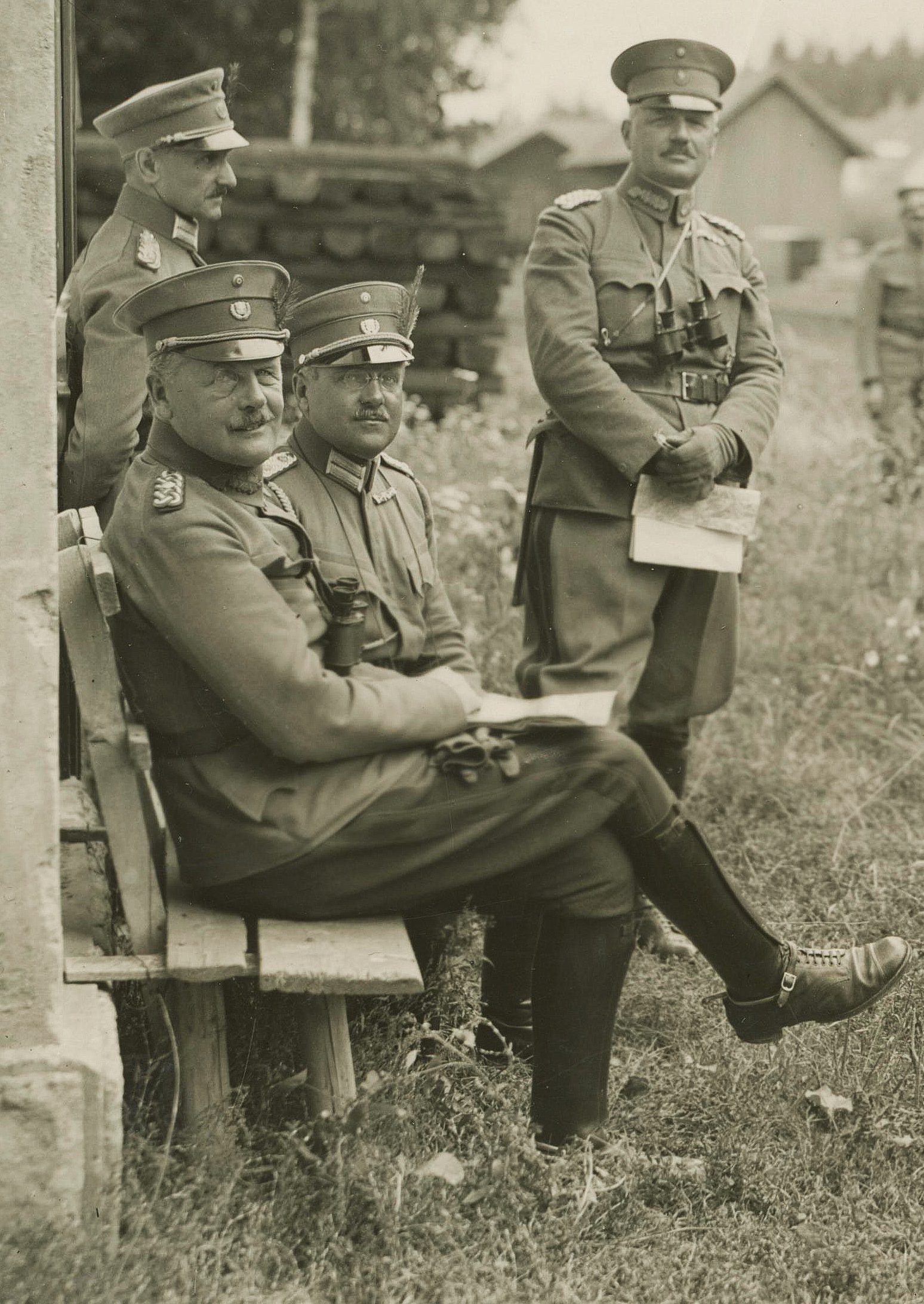
Gen. Eimannsberger observing a Manoeuver

== First Austrian Republic ==
After the collapse of Austria-Hungary, Eimannsberger worked to ensure that Austria, which had been vastly reduced in size, had a capable army at its disposal despite the restrictions that were imposed to the greatest degree possible. He was commissioned as a colonel in the Bundesheer and worked as a teacher at the Officers' School. From 1926, he headed the weapons technology section of the Federal Ministry of the Army as Inspector of Artillery. In 1927, he became Section Chief. Finally, from 1929 to 28 February 1930, he was Army Inspector of the Federal Army and thus the highest-ranking officer in Austria.

== Second World War ==
In 1938, he would rejoin the now German military as a general of artillery, but he was not further deployed for the time being, as the Wehrmacht severely demoted all senior officers who had originally served in the Bundesheer at the beginning of the war.

In 1940, he was given an inappropriate function of senior artillery officer on the staff of the High Command East, but after a few idle months, he found himself expendable and requested his dismissal. In 1943, he was discharged from the army entirely. At the beginning of 1945, shortly before the occupation of Vienna by the Red Army, Eimannsberger left his home in Mödling with his wife, Charlotte, and went to Mutters, near Innsbruck, to the family of his first-born son, where he would die in July that year.

== Works ==
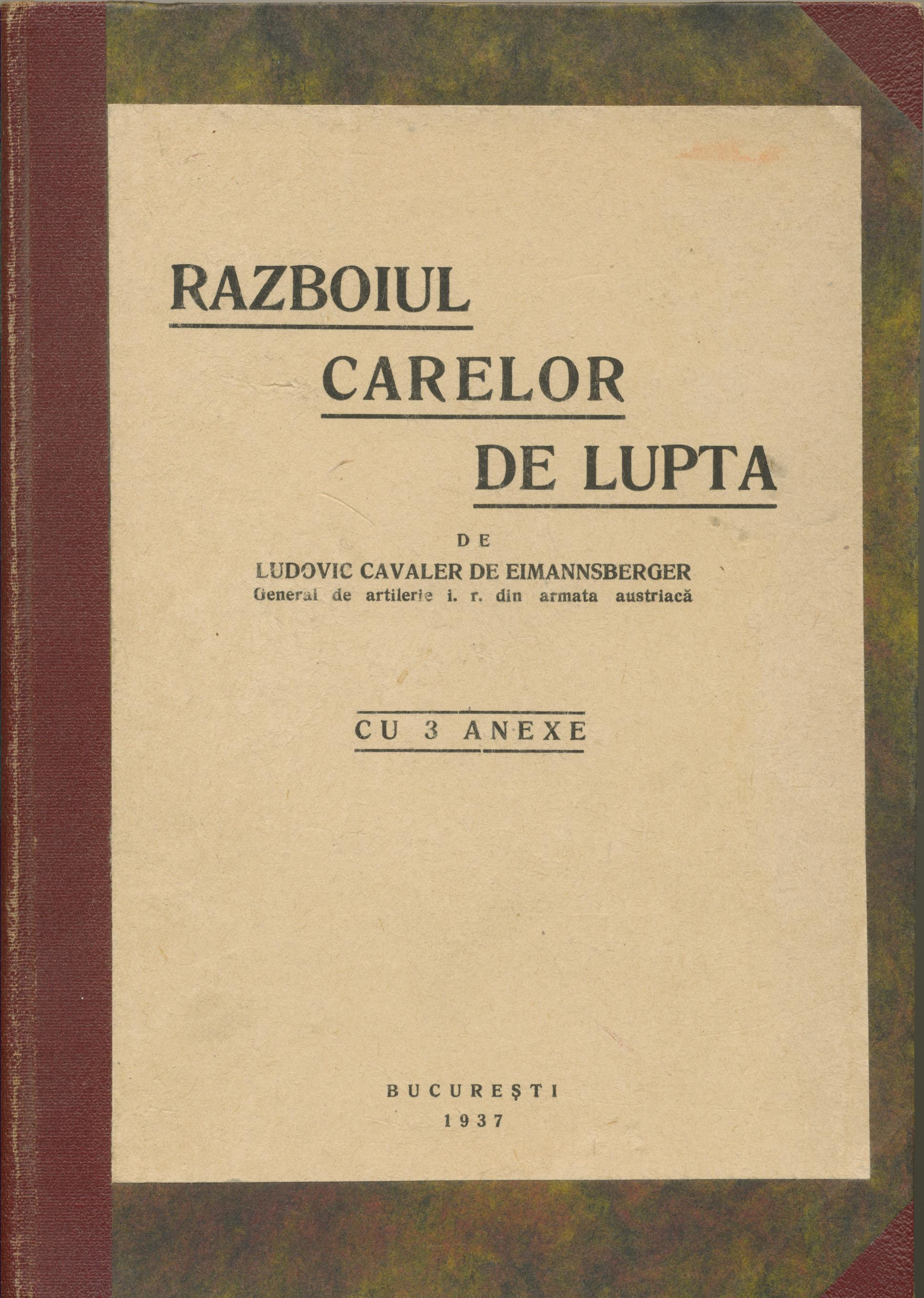
Der Kampfwagenkrieg by Eimannsberger, Romanian edition (there were also editions in French, Polish and Russian)

On his first retirement from 1930 onwards, Eimannsberger would function as a scientific military-technical private scholar. All his attention was focused on the new military equipment that revolutionised combat in 1917 and 1918. With scientific thoroughness, Eimannsberger researched the disastrous events for the Central Powers that were brought about by the use of armoured fighting vehicles. From his analyses, Eimannsberger concluded that he outlined in the following words: "Horsemen are dead, there is no place for them next to tanks. While their tasks remain, they will be solved by assigning tank squadrons in the future!" Further, one reads in Eimannsberger's scientific works, which already foreshadowed the tank strategies of the Second World War: "Attack is fire and movement, and the armoured fighting vehicle unites these two elements in one fighting device!" The seemingly-prescient theories of Eimannsberger were practically proven in the Second World War with the blitzkrieg.

Eimannsberger tried to publish his book Der Kampfwagenkrieg as early as 1933, but the publication was more difficult than expected. Thus the book was not printed until 1934, but it added a significant work to the volume of military literature of the time. General Heinz Guderian, influenced by Eimannsberger's book, presented similar theories in his 1937 book Achtung - Panzer!, and successfully put theory into practice. Eimannsberger, on the other hand, remained a theoretician, but it was his ground-breaking work's findings on which the famous tank battles of the Invasion of Poland, the Battle of France and the early successes of Operation Barbarossa were. However, Eimannsberger would lack recognition, as Guderian stood out because of his successes as an active troop leader.

In autumn 1943, Eimannsberger wrote a short, never-published manuscript In eigener Sache (On Our Own Account) in which he writes disappointedly that he vehemently disagreed with the role that was assigned to him by Guderian in the history of the Panzerwaffe since the German tank force at the beginning of the Second World War was led according to his very own outlines and principles of combat, and he is thus the creator of the German Panzerwaffe. Eimannsberger's leading role has seen increasing recognition internationally only in recent decades.

== Publications ==
- Der Kampfwagenkrieg. Verlag J.F. Lehmann, München 1934.
