= Breg =

Breg may refer to:

== Places ==
=== Slovenia ===
- Breg, Majšperk, settlement in the Municipality of Majšperk
- Breg, Mežica, settlement in the Municipality of Mežica
- Breg, Sevnica, settlement in the Municipality of Sevnica
- Breg, Žirovnica, village in the Municipality of Žirovnica
- Breg ob Bistrici, settlement in the Municipality of Tržič

=== Serbia ===
- Bački Breg, village

=== Croatia ===
- Breg, Croatia, village in Istria County

== River ==
- Breg (river), river in Germany

== Names ==
- Breg (Irish mythology), considered a classic Celtic Triple Goddess
- Cobthach Cóel Breg, high king of Ireland in the 6th century BC

== Science ==
- Regulatory B cells (Bregs)
