= Brigman =

Brigman is a surname. Notable people with the surname include:

- Anne Brigman (1869–1950), American photographer
- D. J. Brigman (born 1976), American golfer
- June Brigman (born 1960), American comics artist and illustrator
- Megan Brigman (b. 1990), American soccer player
