= Breger =

Breger is a surname. Notable people with the surname include:

- Dave Breger (1908–1970), American cartoonist
- Helen Breger (1918–2013), Austrian-born American visual artist, educator
- Louis Breger (1935–2020), American psychologist, psychotherapist, and scholar

== See also ==
- Berger
