= Alfred Jansa =

Austrian soldier

Alfred Johann Theophil Jansa von Tannenau
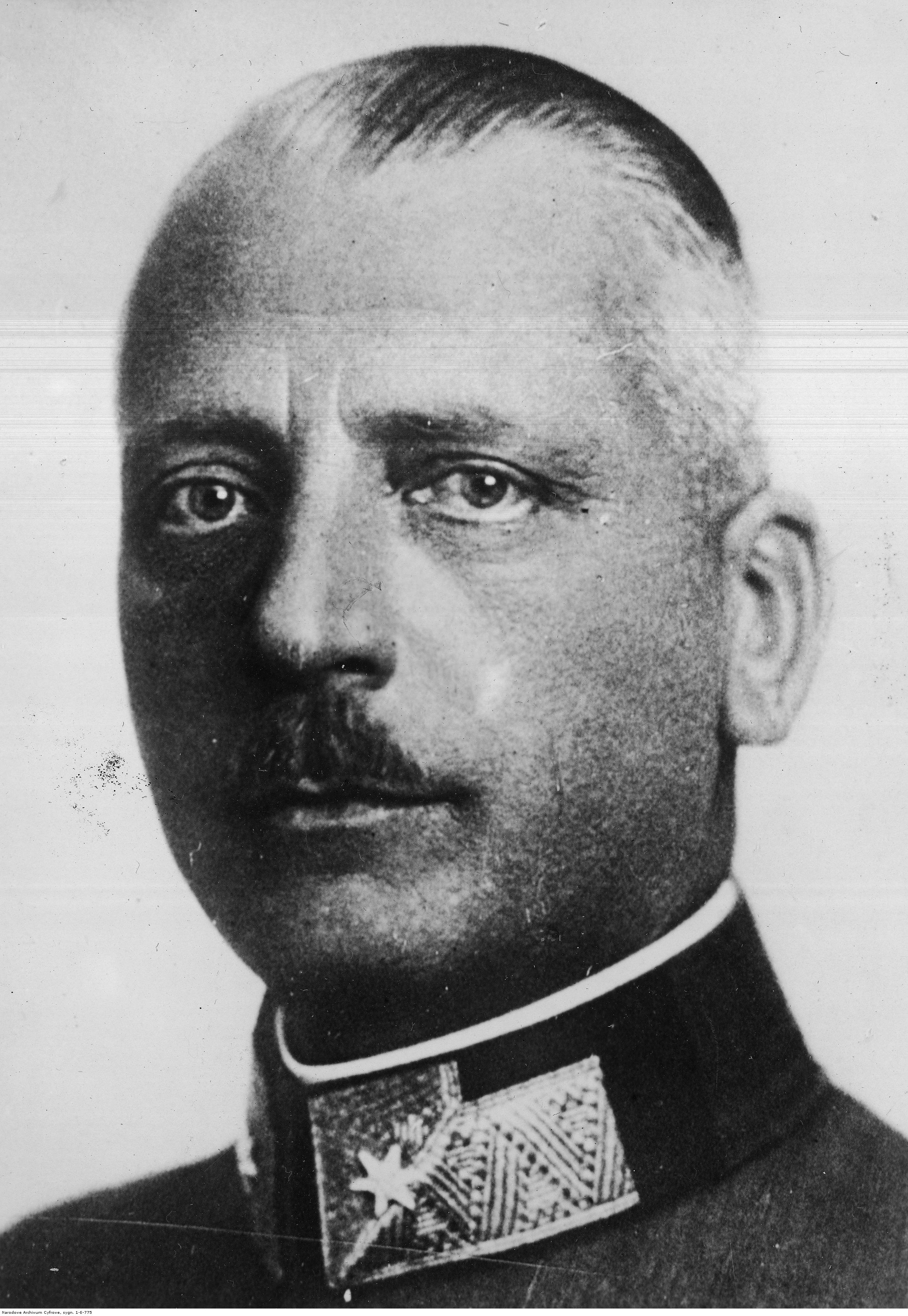
- Born: 16 July 1884; Stanislau, Galicia, Austria-Hungary
- Died: 20 December 1963 (aged 79); Vienna, Austria
- Awards: Grand Silver Medal for Services to the Republic of Austria

Feldmarschalleutnant Alfred Johann Theophil Jansa von Tannenau (16 July 1884 – 20 December 1963) was an Austrian Army Officer. An opponent of Germany and the Anschluss, Jansa was a strong advocate of resisting German annexation by force and pushed for rearmament. In 1938, he and other Austrian officers developed plans to defend against a potential invasion by Nazi Germany. However, the plan was never carried out due to a lack of political willpower.

== Life ==
Alfred Jansa's father was Emanuel Jansa, a colonel in the Austro-Hungarian Army. His mother was Anna von Meyer. During World War I, he held different positions on the Serbian, Italian and Russian fronts, including being Austrian liaison officer to the Bulgarian Army (1915–1916).

Jansa married Judith Reviczky von Revisnye on 8 April 1919.

In 1930 he was the Commander of the Niederösterreich Brigade, until he was appointed the Austrian Military attaché in Berlin in 1933. Afterwards, he was made Chief of Staff of the Austrian Army in 1936.

Prior to the Anschluss, Jansa and his staff had developed a scenario for Austria's defense against a German attack. Chancellor of Austria Kurt Schuschnigg was under considerable pressure from Germany, including a demand to remove Jansa from office. The Berchtesgaden agreement (12 February 1938) stipulated in paragraph 8, that Jansa should be replaced with Franz Böhme. Jansa retired from the army on 17 February 1938.

As a known opponent of the Hitler regime, Jansa was forced into exile in Erfurt along with his family, and his army pension reduced such that he had to supplement it by working for a car parts distributor. He credited a personal intervention by Benito Mussolini, who he had met in 1936, with protecting him from worse consequences.

Jansa survived the war, and in 1945 he was visited by a group of freed prisoners from Buchenwald concentration camp, who thanked him for his moral support. In 1946, he was able to return to Austria.

== Decorations and awards ==
- Gallipoli Star ("Iron Crescent", Ottoman Empire)
- Iron Cross (1914), 1st class
- Military Merit Order, 3rd class with war decoration and swords (Bavaria)
- Decoration for Services to the Red Cross
- Bronze Military Merit Medal on the red band
- Bronze and Silver Military Merit Medal (Austria-Hungary)
- Military Merit Cross, 3rd class with War Decoration (Austria-Hungary)
- Order of the Iron Crown, 3rd class with war decoration and swords
- Grand Silver Medal for Services to the Republic of Austria
