= Robert Brieger =

Chairman of the CEUMC

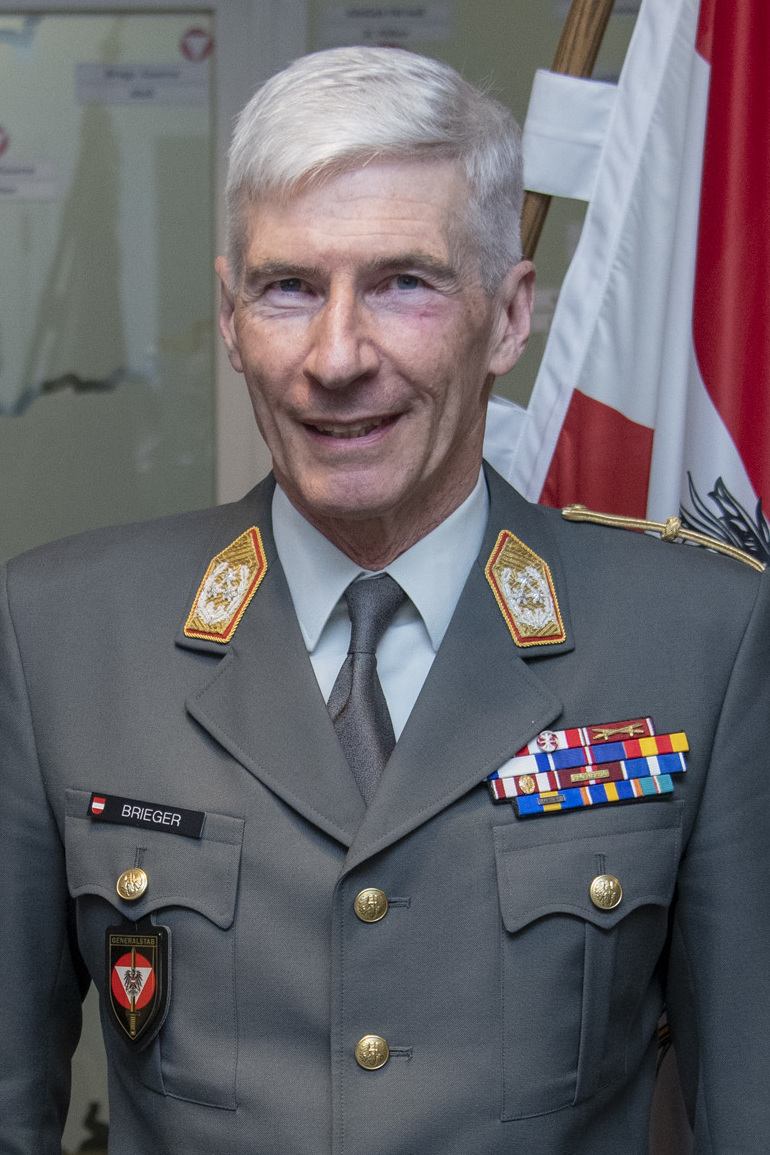

Chairman of the European Union Military Committee
- In office 16 May 2022 – 1 June 2025
- Preceded by: Claudio Graziano
- Succeeded by: Seán Clancy

Chief of the General Staff, Austrian Armed Forces
- In office 24 July 2018 – 6 May 2022
- Preceded by: Othmar Commenda
- Succeeded by: Rudolf Striedinger

Military service
- Allegiance: Austria
- Branch/service: Austrian Land Forces
- Years of service: 1975–present
- Rank: General
- Commands: EUFOR
- Awards: Grand Decoration of Honour

Robert Brieger is an Austrian General of the Austrian Armed Forces who served as Chairman of the European Union Military Committee (CEUMC). Brieger was previously the Chief of General Staff of the Austrian Armed Forces. On 19 May 2021, Brieger was selected as the next CEUMC. He took office 16 May 2022.

== Early Career and Education ==
In 1975, after graduating from high school, Robert Brieger joined the Austrian Federal Army and began his military service. From 1976 to 1979, he attended the Theresian Military Academy in Wiener Neustadt and specialized in the tank branch of the military. He then served as commander of a reconnaissance platoon in Mautern an der Donau and later as a radio officer and company commander in Zwölfaxing. From 1985 to 1988, he completed the General Staff course at the National Defense Academy in Vienna.

== Leadership Role in the Austrian Armed Forces ==
Between his foreign missions, Brieger was head of the Operational Principles Group and responsible for planning Austria's participation in the EU mission in Chad. In 2016, he became head of the Logistics Group before becoming Chief of Staff to the Minister of Defense in 2017.

In July 2018, Brieger was appointed Chief of Staff of the Austrian Armed Forces, succeeding Othmar Commenda.

Military offices
Preceded by Claudio Graziano	Chairman of the EU Military Committee; 16 May 2022 – 1 June 2025	Succeeded by Seán Clancy
Preceded by Othmar Commenda	Chief of the Austrian General Staff; 24 July 2018 – 6 May 2022	Succeeded by Rudolf Striedinger
