= Brieg =

Brieg may refer to:

- Brzeg (German name Brieg), in Silesia, Poland
  - Duchy of Brzeg, a duchy of Silesia from 1311 – 1675
- Briec (Breton name Brieg), a town in Brittany
- Saint-Brieuc (Breton name Sant-Brieg), commune in the Côtes-d'Armor Department in Brittany in north-western France
- Brig, Switzerland
