= Austrian Army Sports Association =

Austrian sports group

- Austrian Army Sports Association Österreichischer Heeressportverband (ÖHSV)
- Formation: 1967.10.19
- Founder: Dr. Georg Prader
- Founded at: Maria-Theresien-Barrack
- Headquarters: Rossauer Barracks
- Location: 1090 Vienna
- Members: 22.500 (2016)
- Official language: German
- Secretary General: Warrant Officer Alexander Lang
- President: Major General Mag. Andreas Pernsteiner
- Managing President: Major General Mag. Heinrich Winkelmayer
- Budget: (2016)
- Staff: 120 (associations) (2016)
- Volunteers: 374 (sections) (2016)
- Website: www.heeressport.at

The Austrian Army Sports Association (German: Österreichischer Heeressportverband, short: ÖHSV) was founded on October 19, 1967, in the theatre of the Maria-Theresien-Barrack during the general assembly. Responsible therefore was the Federal Minister of Defense, Dr. Georg Prader. His ministerial order says, "In this organisation sports officers and non-commissioned officers should find a new field of activity which is available in their leisure time." The Austrian Army Sports Association will always be making an effort to maintain the contacts and connections to other civil sport federations. The biggest sponsor of this organisation is Austrian Armed Forces.

== History ==
In 1930 the Austrian Army Sports Association was founded as an association of the Ministry of War. A precursor already existed in 1921. It was a garrison sports association of the Austrian Armed Forces in the First Austrian Republic. The structure was very similar to today.

This organisation stood out of politics in the First Austrian Republic and in the corporate state. In 1935 the Austrian Army Sports Association withdrew from civil events. The new focus was set on military competitions.

In 1938 the organisation was dissolved. During the occupation period by the Allies, after the World War II a sports club founded from the B-Constabulary in Tyrol. This club started in 1956 as the first Army Sports Association, followed by clubs in Graz, Salzburg and Vienna.

The idea to create a new governing body rose up. Civil organisations feared the expansion of a military sports organisation analogical to organisations from the Eastern Bloc. They were afraid to lose athletes and financial promotions. The Federal Minister of Defense Dr. Georg Prader ordered in 1965 the founding of the Austrian Army Sports Association. The reestablishment happened on October 19, 1967.

Since 1992 the Austrian Army Sports Association divided into nine national associations and 90 sport categories. The organisation hosted or highly supported international championships several times. Some examples are Ironman Austria, Biathlon World Championships 2005, Marc-Aurel-March or the Austrian part of the Vienna–Bratislava–Budapest Supermarathon.

== Sporting successes ==
In 1988 the biathlete Warrant Officer Alfred Eder from Saalfelden occupied the 4th place at the Winter Olympics 1988 in Calgary. In the year of the 25th anniversary Austrian Army Sports Association athletes got two silver medals and one gold medal participating at the Winter Olympics 1992 in Albertville as a present.

Ten years later another athlete cheered about an Olympic medal. Christoph Bieler (HSV Sparkasse Absam) reached bronze in the team competition 4 x 5 km (Nordic combination) at the Winter Olympics 2002 in Salt Lake City. Bieler achieved gold in the same competition on February 15, at the Winter Olympics 2006 in Turin.

Over 60 sportsmen from the Army Sports Association are part of Olympic Games. More than 600 medals were won in World, European and Military championships, European championships of the CISM, also World, European and Alp cups. Additionally, 40 World and European records and two world best performances were set.

More than 3.000 State and Austrian titles are the result from specific promotion of youth, implemented by the front men of the Austrian Army Sports Association the country representative for a type of sport.

In 2004 the Austrian Army Sports Association counted the highest membership figure with over 30.000 persons.

== Presidium ==
On June 26, 2014, the current presidium was elected at the association days in Hochfilzen. The next election will be on the association days in 2018.

Current presidium
Function	Rank	Name
President	Major General	Mag. Andreas Pernsteiner
Managing President	Major General	Mag. Heinrich Winkelmayer
1st Finance director	Warrant Officer	Josef Tauß
2nd Finance director	Master Sergeant	Thomas Grabner
1st Writer		Katharina Mollich
2nd Writer		Michael Lang

== Committee ==
The committee consists of one counsellor from each province, an assessor from the Federal Ministry for National Defence and Sport and two auditors. On the association days, every counsellor is allowed to bring up two more counsellors. All these people including the presidium can vote to make decisions at these days.

Current committee
Province	Name
Carinthia	Dr. Alexander Kastner
Lower Austria	Franz Karner
Upper Austria	Lieutenant Colonel Gebhard Leitner
Styria	Volker Sommer
Tyrol	Mag. iur. Gerold Trimmel
Vorarlberg	Major Harald Imlauer
Vienna	Robert Parik
Salzburg	Ing. Walter Trinker
Burgenland	Lieutenant Colonel Franz Rechberger
Counsellor Ministry of Defence and Sport	Brigadier Mag. Harald Leopold
Auditors	Lieutenant Colonel Franz Schuster
	Renate Spernbauer

== Country representative for a type of sport ==
The country representative persons are elected from the committee after necessity. Their responsibilities are the coordination of high-performance and competitive sports. They should also coordinate the whole youth level of the Austrian Army sports in their section. Courses and the execution of Austrian Army Sports Association championships are also included in their activities.

Their working area covered the whole Federal territory. A country representative for a type of sport need the following requirements and should fulfill these activities:

- Expertise in his type of sport, a graduated education minimal requirement instructor/teacher is expected.
- A country representative for a type of sport should have passed the official body ground course at the Austrian Armed Forces.
- He also should create a work schedule and financing plan for high-performance and competitive sports as well as the youth level. This plan should cover one calendar year.

The Austrian Army Sports Association elected the following country representatives for a type of sport (as of January 2017).

Country representative for a type of sport
Type of sport	Name
Biathlon	Warrant Officer Reinhard Grossegger
Parachuting	Lieutenant Colonel Gernot Rittenschober
Golf	Warrant Officer Dietmar Fellner
Orienteering	Colonel MSD Ewald Mayer
Shooting	Franz Gruber
Dancing	DDI Peter Kielhauser
Tennis	Warrant Officer Willibald Kienegger

== Association days ==
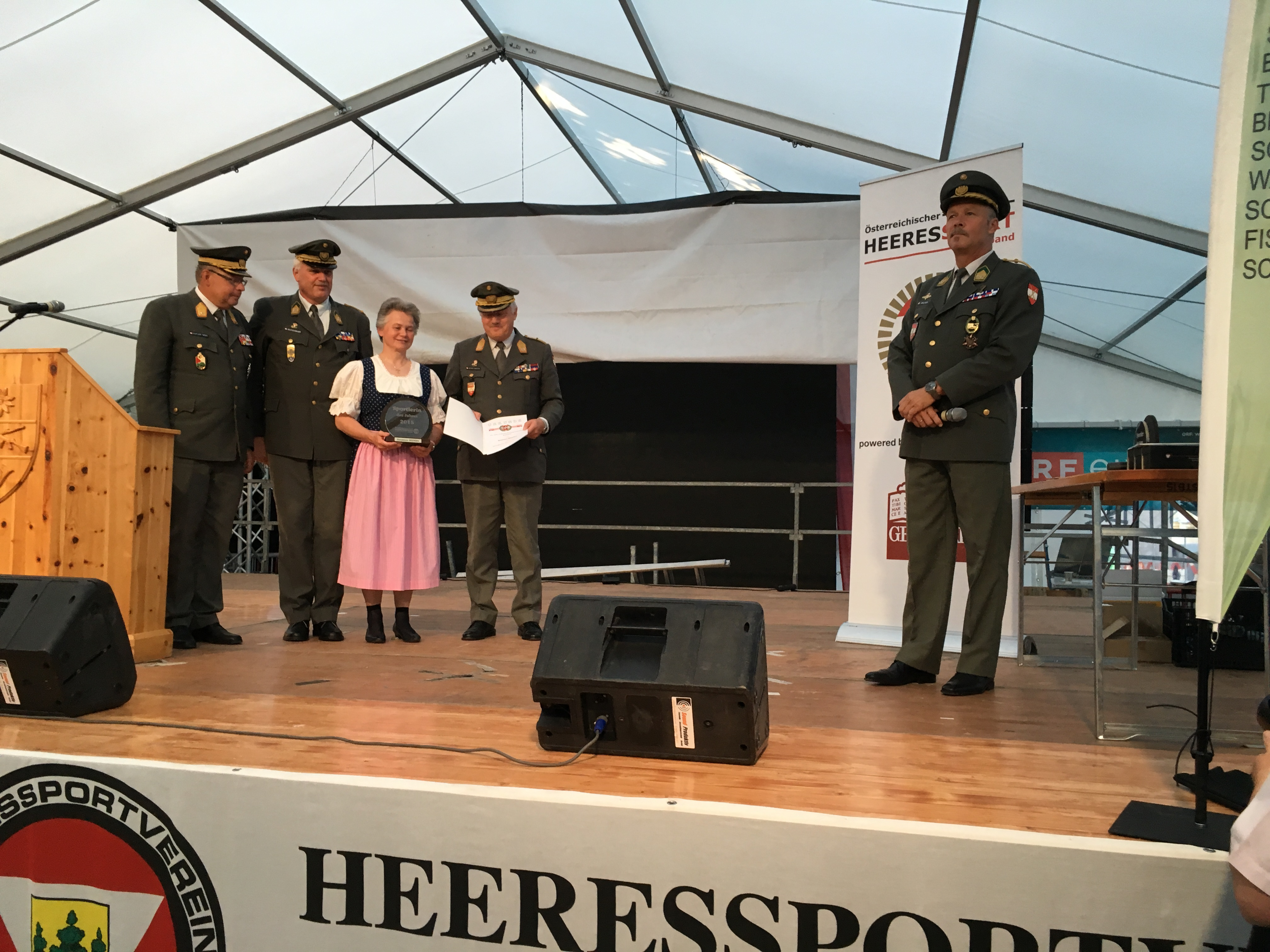
Honor of Susanne Menda 3rd from the left.

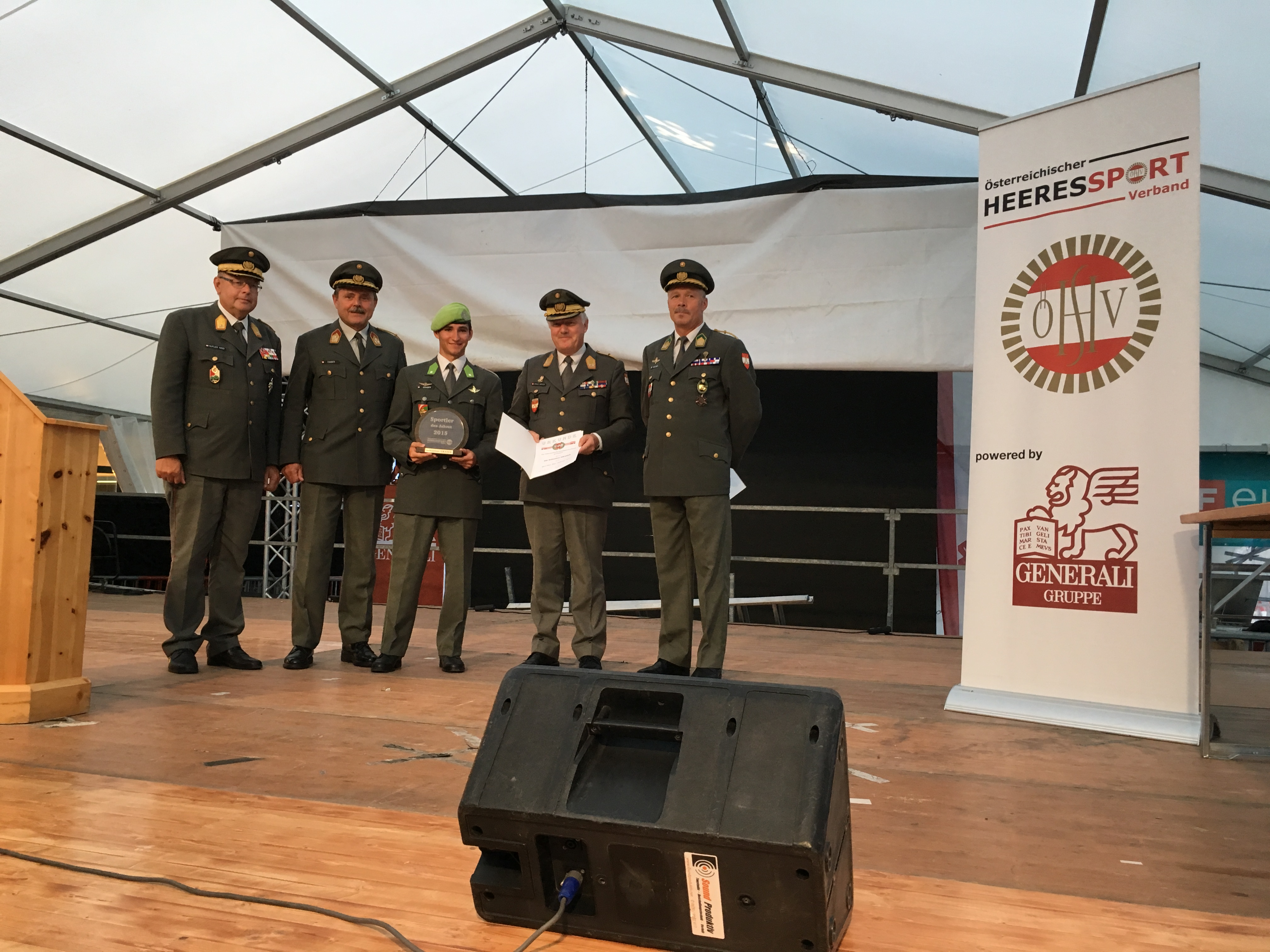
Honor of Sebastian Graser 3rd from the right.

Since 1968 the Austrian Army Sports Association held yearly association days. Most of the time this event takes two days.

For decisions like a new presidium, or other important judgements these days are very important.

In 2017 the association day will be combined with the ceremony of the occasion "50 years Austrian Army Sports Association". It is planned to enthuse about 300 people with Austrian top athletes, interviews, an anniversary publication and a lot more. This event will be on May 31 and June 1, 2017.

In connection with the 49th association days the sportsman of the year 2015 Sebastian Graser (Parachuting/HSV Red Bull Salzburg) and the sportswoman of the year 2015 Susanne Menda (Weightlifting/HSV Langenlebarn) were honoured.
