= Norbert Darabos =

Austrian politician (born 1964)

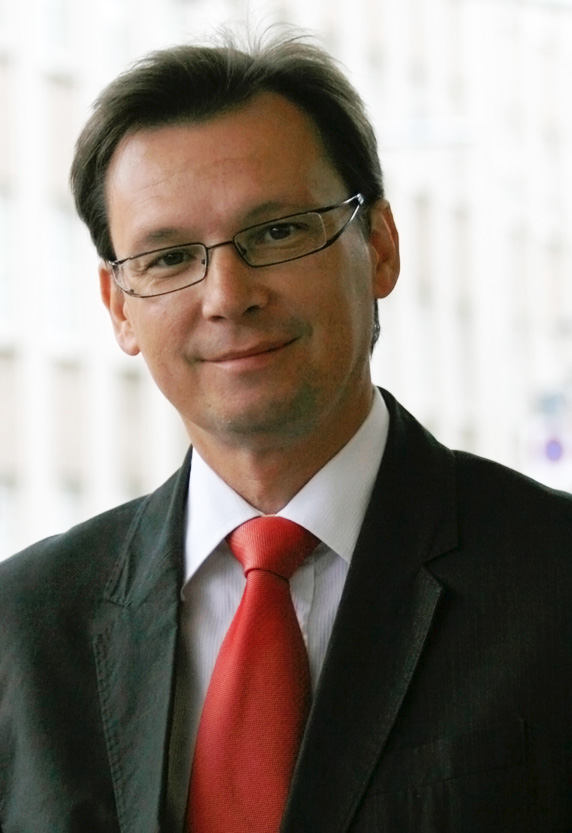

Minister of Defense and Sports
- In office 11 January 2007 – 11 March 2013
- Appointed by: Heinz Fischer
- Chancellor: Werner Faymann
- Preceded by: Günther Platter
- Succeeded by: Gerald Klug

Personal details
- Born: 31 May 1964 (age 60); Vienna, Austria
- Political party: Social Democratic Party

Norbert Darabos (born 31 May 1964) is an Austrian politician. Currently, he serves as the president of the Austrian Study Centre for Peace and Conflict Resolution (ASPR). From 2007 to 2013, he served as Minister of National Defence under the chancellors Gusenbauer and Faymann. From 2015 to 2016, he was secretary general of the Social Democratic Party of Austria (SPÖ). He is married and has two children.

== Personal life and political career ==
Darabos was born in Vienna. From 1982 to 1988 he studied history and political science at the University of Vienna, where he graduated in 1988. In 1987/88 he made his Alternative civilian service.

In the period 1988 till 1991 Darabos was chief executive of the federal branch of the Dr.-Karl-Renner-Institute in Burgenland, a social democratic think tank. Between 1991 and 1998 he was press speaker for the Governor of the Province of Burgenland, Karl Stix. Since 1998 he is executive secretary of the SPÖ Burgenland. On 19 May 1999 he became a member of the federal parliament. Between December 2000 till March 2003, Darabos was the head of the Social Democratic Group in the federal parliament of Burgenland.

In March 2003, Darabos became secretary general of the Social Democratic Party of Austria. In 2004 he ran the election campaign of later President of Austria Heinz Fischer, and on 16 June 2004 he became a member of the Austrian parliament (SPÖ).

After the 2006 Austrian legislative election, in which the SPÖ gained the majority of the votes, Darabos became a member of the team that negotiated for a coalition with the Austrian People's Party (ÖVP). In the following Grand coalition, which took office on 11 January 2007, Darabos became Minister of National Defence. Since 2 December 2008 his duties also comprised sports.

In 2010 Vienna's mayor Michael Häupl (SPÖ) suggested it should be decided whether young Austrians should still have to serve in the army. Darabos promised "full support" for Häupl's idea of abolishing the conscription, that for the 2013 Austrian conscription referendum takes place. On 11 March 2013 Darabos resigned as minister in order to return as Secretary General of his party, responsible for running the upcoming parliament elections.

== Awards ==
In 2010, Darabos received the Grand Decoration for Services to the Republic of Austria in Gold with Sash (Großes Goldenes Ehrenzeichen am Bande für die Verdienste um die Republik Österreich).

== Notes and references ==
Political offices
Preceded by Günther Platter	Minister of National Defence and Sport; 2007 – 2013	Succeeded by Gerald Klug
