= Gerald Klug =

Austrian politician (born 1968)

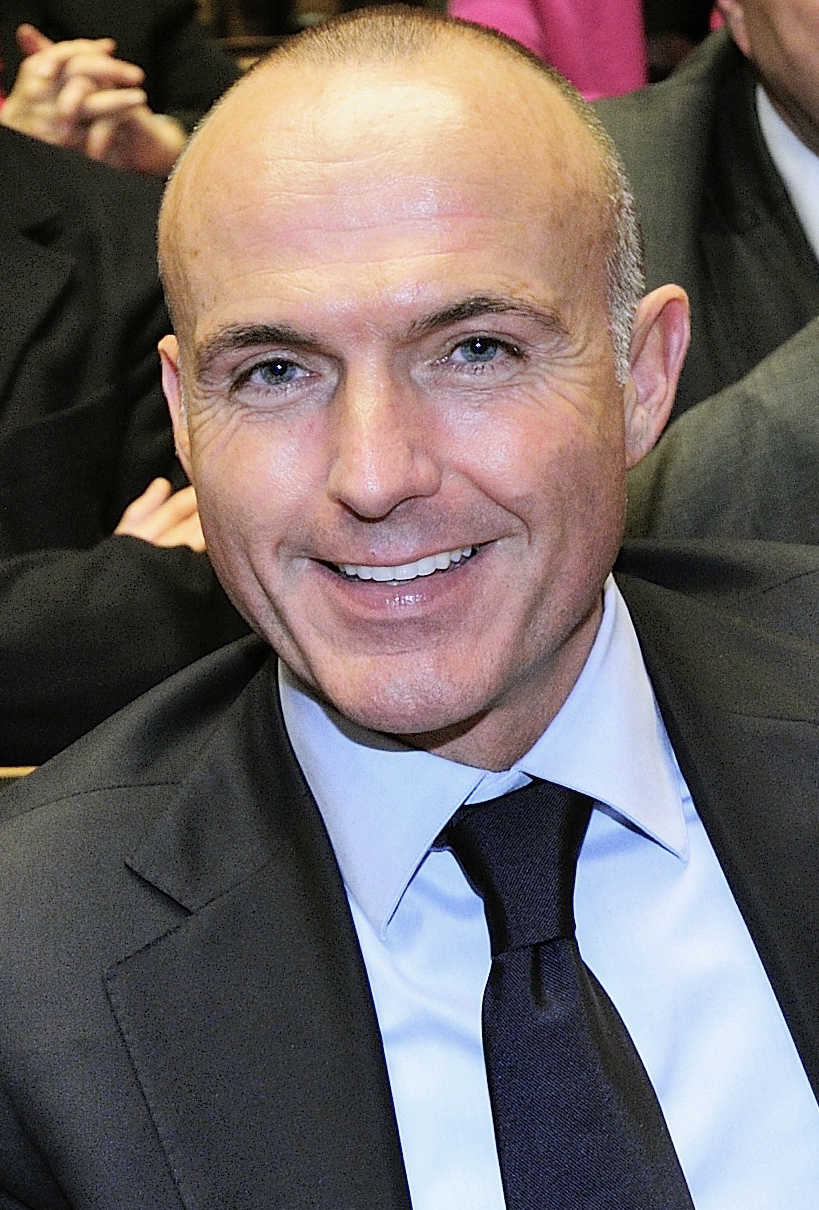
- Gerald Klug, 2014

Minister of Transport, Innovation and Technology
- In office 26 January 2016 – 18 May 2016
- Appointed by: Heinz Fischer
- Chancellor: Werner Faymann
- Preceded by: Alois Stöger
- Succeeded by: Jörg Leichtfried

Minister of Defense and Sports
- In office 11 March 2013 – 28 January 2016
- Appointed by: Heinz Fischer
- Chancellor: Werner Faymann
- Preceded by: Norbert Darabos
- Succeeded by: Hans Peter Doskozil

Personal details
- Born: 13 November 1968 (age 57) Graz, Austria
- Party: Social Democratic Party
- Education: Karl-Franzens University
- Profession: Jurist

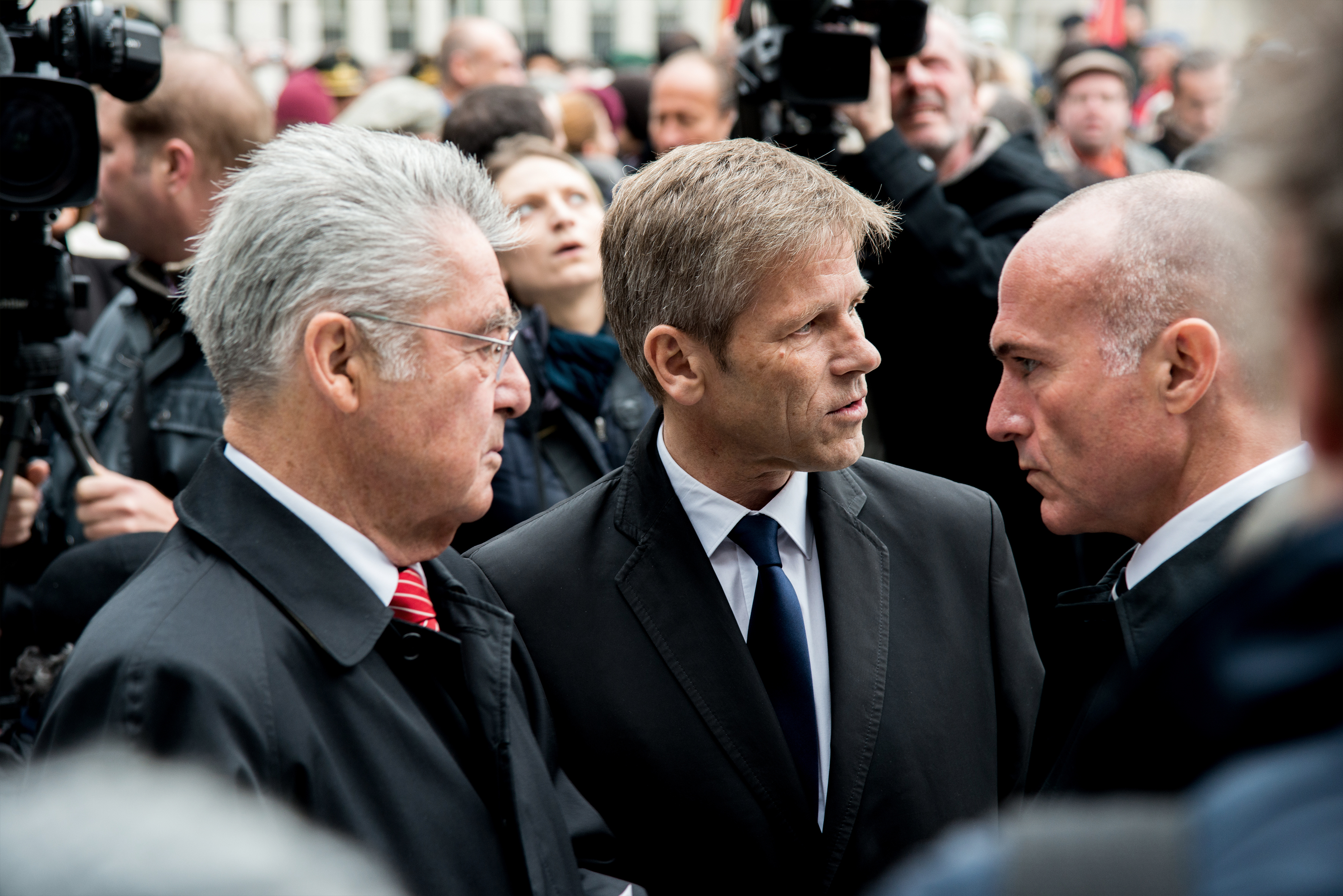
With President Fischer and Minister Ostermayer at the Opening of the Memorial for the Victims of Nazi Military Justice, Ballhausplatz 2014

Gerald Klug (born 13 November 1968) is an Austrian jurist and politician who served as minister of transport, innovation and technology in 2016. A member of the Social Democratic Party, he previously served as minister of defence and sports from 2013 to 2016.

== Early life and education ==
Klug was born in Graz on 13 November 1968. After graduating from technical college in Graz and vocational school he served in the Austrian army from 1987 to 1988. He received a law degree from Karl-Franzens University in 2001.

== Career ==
Klug is a member of the Social Democratic Party and chairman of the party in the Austrian Federal Council, Austria’s Upper House. He was first elected to the council in 2005. He was appointed federal minister of defence and sports in the cabinet led by Prime Minister Werner Faymann on 11 March 2013, replacing Norbert Darabos in the post. On 28 January 2016 Klug's term ended and he was replaced by Hans Peter Doskozil in the post.
