= Minister of Defense (Austria) =

- Bundesminister für Landesverteidigung
- Coat of arms

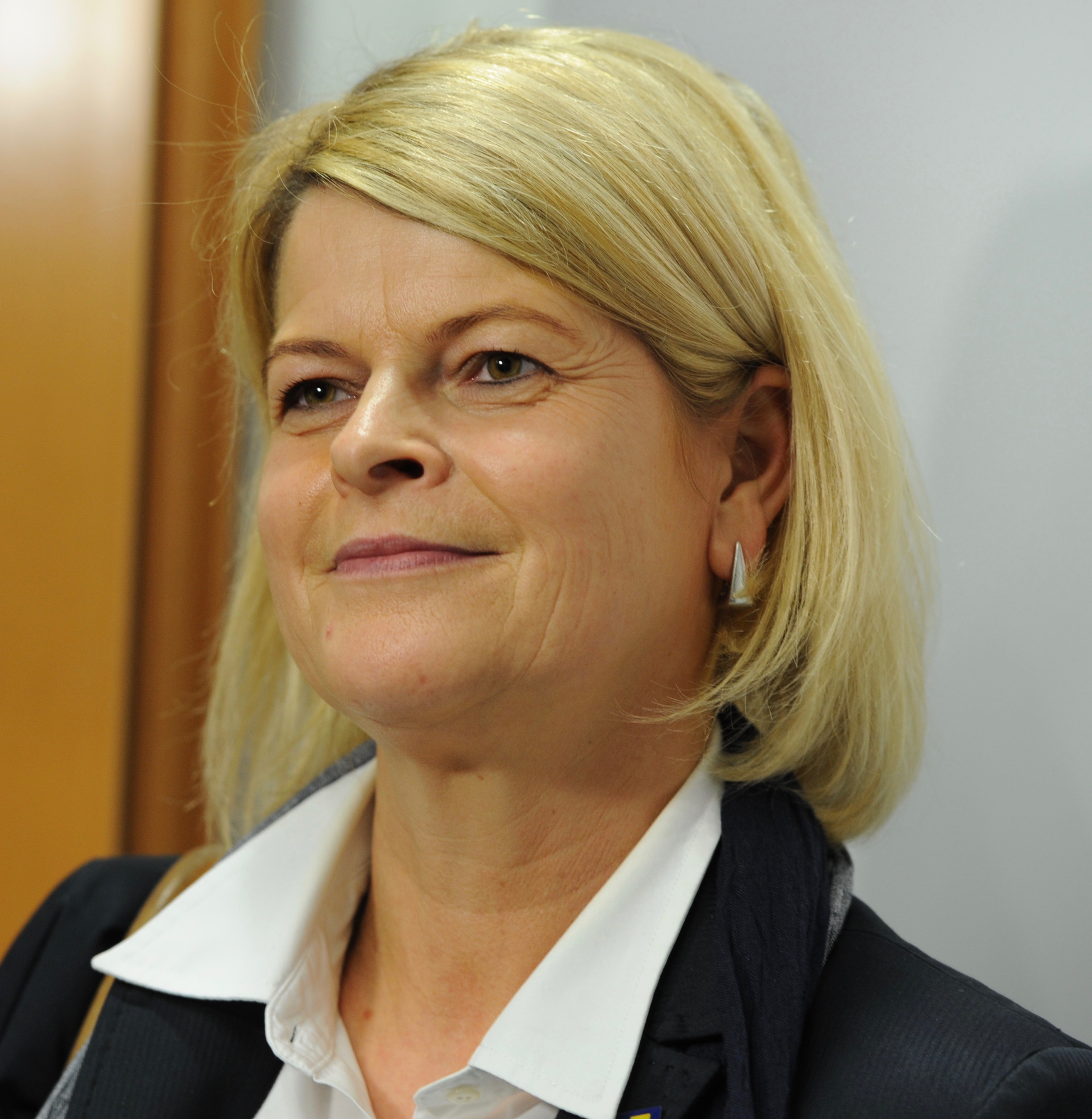
- Incumbent; Klaudia Tanner since 7 January 2020
- Ministry of Defense
- Style: Mrs. Federal minister (formal)
- Member of: Federal Government; Council of Ministers; National Security Council
- Seat: Rossauer Barracks, Innere Stadt, Vienna
- Nominator: Political parties
- Appointer: The president on advice of the chancellor
- Constituting instrument: Constitution of Austria; Defense law
- Precursor: Imperial and Royal Minister of War
- First holder: Josef Mayer in the first Republic (10 November 1920); Ferdinand Graf in the second Republic
- Website: bundesheer.at (in English) bundesheer.at (in German)

The minister of defense of Austria heads the Ministry of Defense.

== First Austrian Republic ==
No.	Portrait	Name (Birth–Death)	Term			Political Party	Government
No.	Portrait	Name (Birth–Death)	Took office	Left office (Note: Based on when the successor took office)	Duration	Political Party	Government
State Ministry for the Army (Staatsamt für Heereswesen)
1	Josef Mayer [de]	Josef Mayer (1877–1938)	30 October 1918	15 March 1919	136 days	DNP	Renner I Cabinet
2	Julius Deutsch	Julius Deutsch (1884–1968)	15 March 1919	22 October 1920	1 year, 221 days	SDAPÖ	Renner II–III; Mayr I Cabinet
3	Walter Breisky	Walter Breisky (1871–1944)	22 October 1920	22 November 1920	29 days	CS	Mayr I Cabinet
Federal Ministry for the Army (Bundesministerium für Heereswesen)
4	Egon Glanz [de]	Egon Glanz (1880–1945); Beamter	22 November 1920	7 April 1921	29 days	Nonpartisan	Mayr II Cabinet
(3)	Walter Breisky	Walter Breisky (1871–1944)	7 April 1921	28 April 1921	21 days	CS	Mayr II Cabinet
5	Carl Vaugoin	Carl Vaugoin (1873–1949)	28 April 1921	7 October 1921	162 days	CS	Mayr II Cabinet; Schober I Cabinet
6	Josef Wächter [de]	Josef Wächter (1866–1949); Army officer	7 October 1921	31 May 1922	236 days	Nonpartisan	Schober I Cabinet–II
(5)	Carl Vaugoin*	Carl Vaugoin* (1873–1949)	31 May 1922	21 September 1933	11 years, 113 days	CS	Seipel I Cabinet–II–III; Ramek I Cabinet–II; Seipel IV–V; Streeruwitz; Schober III; Vaugoin; Ender; Buresch I–II; Dollfuss I
7	Engelbert Dollfuss*	Engelbert Dollfuss* (1892–1934)	21 September 1933	12 March 1934	172 days	CS	Dollfuss II Cabinet
8	Alois Schönburg-Hartenstein	Alois Schönburg-Hartenstein (1858–1944); Army officer	12 March 1934	10 July 1934	120 days	Nonpartisan	Dollfuss II Cabinet
(7)	Engelbert Dollfuss*	Engelbert Dollfuss* (1892–1934)	10 July 1934	25 July 1934 †	15 days	VF	Dollfuss II Cabinet
9	Ernst Rüdiger Starhemberg	Ernst Rüdiger Starhemberg (1899–1956); Acting	26 July 1934	29 July 1934	3 days	VF	Dollfuss II Cabinet
Federal Ministry for National Defence (Bundesministerium für Landesverteidigung)
10	Kurt Schuschnigg*	Kurt Schuschnigg* (1897–1977)	29 July 1934	11 March 1938	3 years, 225 days	VF	Schuschnigg I Cabinet–II–III–IV
11	Arthur Seyss-Inquart*	Arthur Seyss-Inquart* (1892–1946)	11 March 1938	13 March 1938	2 days	NSDAP	Seyss-Inquart Cabinet

* Partly as Chancellor or Vice-Chancellor.

== Second Austrian Republic ==
No.	Portrait	Name (Birth–Death)	Term			Political Party	Government
No.	Portrait	Name (Birth–Death)	Took office	Left office	Duration	Political Party	Government
Ministry for National Defence
No minister, section of the Federal Chancellory Ministry (Bundeskanzleramt)
Federal Ministry for National Defence (Bundesministerium für Landesverteidigung)
1	Ferdinand Graf [de]	Ferdinand Graf (1907–1969)	15 July 1956	11 April 1961	4 years, 270 days	ÖVP	Raab II Cabinet–II–III
2	Karl Schleinzer [de]	Karl Schleinzer (1924–1975)	11 April 1961	2 April 1964	2 years, 357 days	ÖVP	Gorbach I Cabinet–II
3	Georg Prader [de]	Georg Prader (1917–1985)	2 April 1964	21 April 1970	6 years, 19 days	ÖVP	Klaus I Cabinet–II
4	Johann Freihsler [de]	Brigadier; Johann Freihsler (1917–1981)	21 April 1970	4 February 1971	289 days	Independent	Kreisky I Cabinet
–	Bruno Kreisky	Bruno Kreisky (1911–1990); Acting	4 February 1971	8 February 1971	4 days	SPÖ	Kreisky I Cabinet
5	Karl Lütgendorf	Brigadier; Karl Lütgendorf (1914–1981)	8 February 1971	31 May 1977	6 years, 112 days	Independent	Kreisky I Cabinet–II–III
–	Bruno Kreisky	Bruno Kreisky (1911–1990); Acting	31 May 1977	8 June 1977	8 days	SPÖ	Kreisky III Cabinet
6	Otto Rösch	Otto Rösch (1917–1995)	8 June 1977	21 May 1983	5 years, 347 days	SPÖ	Kreisky III Cabinet–II
7	Friedhelm Frischenschlager	Friedhelm Frischenschlager (born 1943)	21 May 1983	12 May 1986	2 years, 356 days	FPÖ	Sinowatz Cabinet
8	Helmut Krünes [de]	Helmut Krünes (born 1941)	12 May 1986	21 January 1987	254 days	FPÖ	Sinowatz Cabinet; Vranitzky I Cabinet
9	Robert Lichal	Robert Lichal (1932–2024)	21 January 1987	6 November 1990	3 years, 289 days	ÖVP	Vranitzky II Cabinet
–	Alois Mock*	Alois Mock* (1934–2017); Acting	6 November 1990	17 December 1990	41 days	ÖVP	Vranitzky II Cabinet
10	Werner Fasslabend	Werner Fasslabend (born 1944)	17 December 1990	4 February 2000	9 years, 49 days	ÖVP	Vranitzky III Cabinet–II–III; Klima Cabinet
11	Herbert Scheibner [de]	Herbert Scheibner (born 1963)	4 February 2000	28 February 2003	3 years, 24 days	FPÖ	Schüssel I Cabinet
12	Günther Platter	Günther Platter (born 1954)	28 February 2003	11 January 2007	3 years, 317 days	ÖVP	Schüssel II Cabinet
13	Norbert Darabos	Norbert Darabos (born 1964)	11 January 2007	11 March 2013	6 years, 59 days	SPÖ	Gusenbauer Cabinet; Faymann I Cabinet
Federal Ministry for National Defence and Sport (Bundesministerium für Landesverteidigung und Sport)
14	Gerald Klug	Gerald Klug (born 1968)	11 March 2013	26 January 2016	2 years, 321 days	SPÖ	Faymann I Cabinet–II
15	Hans Peter Doskozil	Hans Peter Doskozil (born 1970)	26 January 2016	18 December 2017	1 year, 326 days	SPÖ	Faymann II Cabinet; Kern Cabinet
16	Mario Kunasek	Mario Kunasek (born 1976)	18 December 2017	8 January 2018	21 days	FPÖ	Kurz I Cabinet
Federal Ministry for National Defence (Bundesministerium für Landesverteidigung)
16	Mario Kunasek	Mario Kunasek (born 1976)	8 January 2018	20 May 2019	1 year, 132 days	FPÖ	Kurz I Cabinet
17	Johann Luif	Lieutenant General; Johann Luif (born 1959)	22 May 2019	3 June 2019	12 days	Independent	Kurz I Cabinet
18	Thomas Starlinger [de]	Major General; Thomas Starlinger (born 1963)	3 June 2019	7 January 2020	218 days	Independent	Bierlein Cabinet
19	Klaudia Tanner	Klaudia Tanner (born 1970)	7 January 2020	Incumbent	6 years, 243 days	ÖVP	Kurz II Cabinet; Schallenberg Cabinet; Nehammer Cabinet; Stocker Cabinet

*Entrusted with continuation of the ministry

== See also ==
- Supreme Commander of the Imperial and Royal Armed Forces
- Minister of War (Austria-Hungary)
- Austrian Minister of Defence (Austria-Hungary)
- Ministry of Defense (Austria)
- Chief of the General Staff (Austria)
