= Robert Bernardis =

Austrian Wehrmacht officer and resistance fighter (1908–1943)

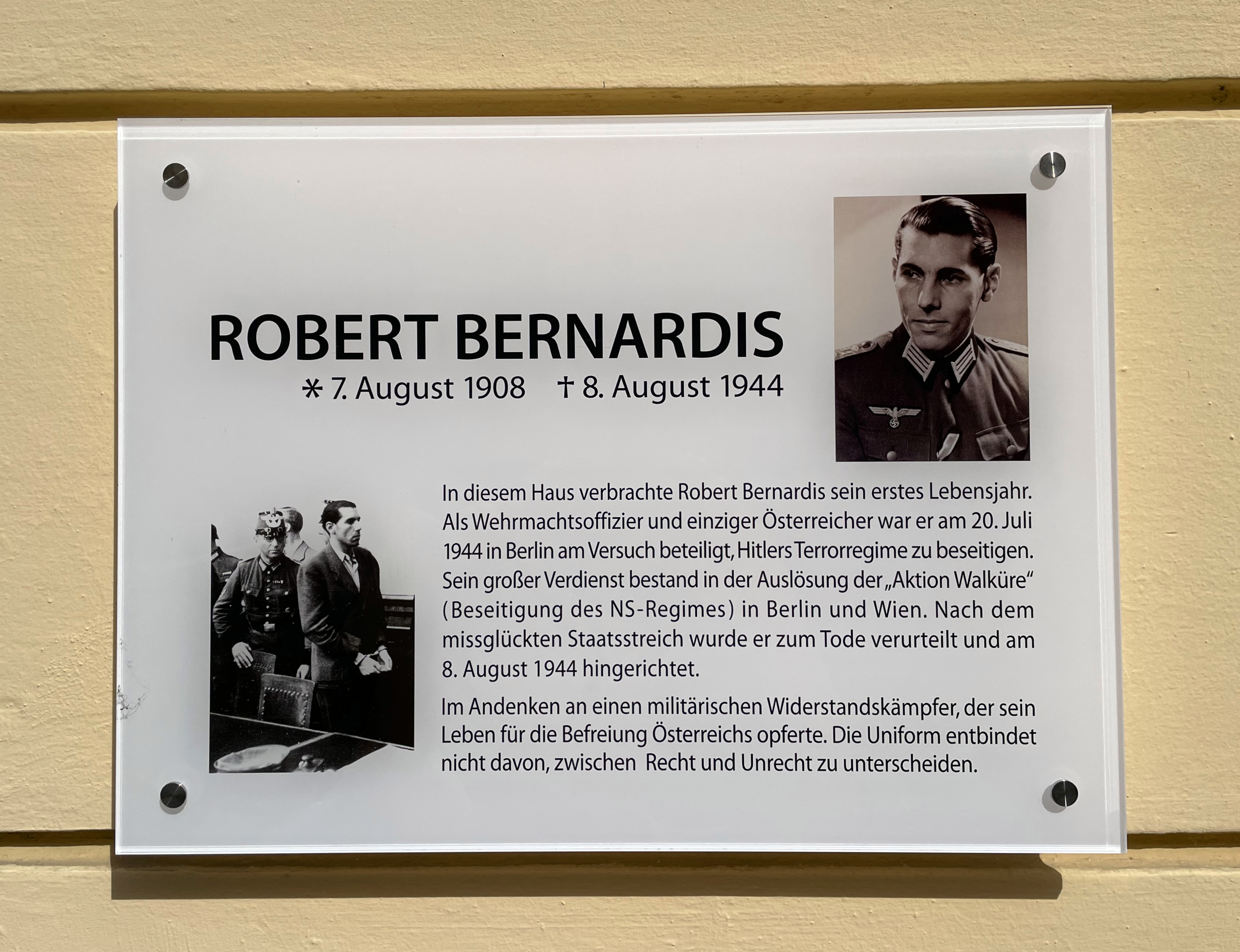
- Memorial plaque in Innsbruck, 2024
- Born: 7 August 1908; Innsbruck, Austria-Hungary
- Died: 8 August 1944 (aged 36); Plötzensee Prison, Berlin, Nazi Germany
- Military career
- Allegiance: Austria; Nazi Germany
- Branch: German Army
- Rank: Oberstleutnant
- Unit: German General Staff
- Conflicts: World War II

Robert Bernardis (7 August 1908 – 8 August 1944) was a German army officer and Austrian resistance fighter involved in the attempt to kill Nazi Germany's dictator Adolf Hitler in the 20 July Plot in 1944.

== Life, resistance, death ==
After finishing the military academy in Enns and Klosterneuburg, Austria, Bernardis started his military career as a lieutenant in Linz. After the Anschluss in 1938, he accepted the new regime but remained critical. However, once the Second World War had begun, experiences at the front such as witnessing the murder of civilians changed his mind and he became involved in the resistance movement against the Third Reich. He was assigned to the German General Staff by May 1942.

By 1944, though still relatively young, he held the rank of an Oberstleutnant. He was not stationed near Hitler's headquarters at Wolfsschanze, near Rastenburg, when the 20 July assassination attempt was carried out, but he was in Berlin instead. Unaware that the bomb had failed to kill Hitler, Bernardis was responsible for the order that set Operation Valkyrie in motion. The same evening, he was arrested by the Gestapo. On 8 August, he was sentenced to death by the German "People's Court" (Volksgerichtshof) and executed the same day.

Despite being deported to a concentration camp, Bernardis's family survived the war.

== Portrayal in media ==
In the 2004 German production Stauffenberg, Bernardis is portrayed by actor Michael Bornhütter.

== Commemoration ==
Commemorative plaques were placed at the Vienna military parish (1985) and at his former home in Innsbruck (2024).

In January 2020 the Rossauer Barracks, the headquarters of the Austrian military, were renamed Bernardis-Schmid-Kaserne. The building now remembers Robert Bernardis and Anton Schmid, an Austrian soldier, who saved Jews during the Holocaust in Lithuania.

== Sources ==
- Karl-Reinhart Trauner: Mit Stauffenberg gegen Hitler: Oberstleutnant i.G. Robert Bernardis, Tillinger-Verlag, Szentendre 2008, ISBN 978-963-06-4558-4 (no translations)
- Karl Glaubauf: Robert Bernardis – Österreichs Stauffenberg, Wien 1994, Eigenverlag
- Karl Glaubauf: Robert Bernardis – Österreichs Stauffenberg, in: Austria-Forum, Internet – Lexicon, Graz 2010.
