= Anton Schmid (Righteous Among the Nations) =

Austrian soldier (1900–1942)

- Born: 9 January 1900; Vienna, Austria-Hungary
- Died: 13 April 1942 (aged 42); Stefanska Prison, Vilnius, Reichskommissariat Ostland
- Cause of death: Execution by firing squad
- Occupation: Electrician
- Known for: Saving Jews during the Holocaust
- Spouse: Stefanie Schmid
- Children: Gerta Schmid
- Awards: Righteous Among the Nations
- Military career
- Branch: Austro-Hungarian Army; German Army
- Service years: 1918; 1939–1942
- Rank: Feldwebel
- Units: Landeswehr Battalion 898; Feldkommandantur 814
- Conflicts: World War I; Italian Front; World War II

Anton Schmid (9 January 1900 – 13 April 1942) was an Austrian Wehrmacht recruit who saved Jews during the Holocaust in Lithuania. A devout but apolitical Roman Catholic and an electrician by profession, Schmid was conscripted into the Austro-Hungarian Army during World War I and later into the Wehrmacht during World War II.

Put in charge of an office to return stranded German soldiers to their units in late August 1941, he began to help Jews after being approached by two pleading for his intercession. Schmid hid Jews in his apartment, obtained work permits to save Jews from the Ponary massacre, transferred Jews in Wehrmacht trucks to safer locations, and aided the Vilna Ghetto underground. It is estimated that he saved as many as 300 Jews before his arrest in January 1942. Schmid was court-martialed for actively protecting Jews, sentenced to death, and shot on 13 April 1942.

After the war, Schmid was recognized as Righteous Among the Nations by Yad Vashem for his efforts to help Jews and was seen as a symbol of the few Germans who defied their government's extermination program. His reception was more conflicted in Germany and Austria, where he was still viewed as a traitor for decades. The first official commemoration of him in Germany did not occur until 2000, but he is now hailed as an example of civil courage for Bundeswehr soldiers to follow.

== Early life ==
Anton Schmid was born in Vienna, then Austria-Hungary, on 9 January 1900. His father was a baker, and both of his parents were devout Roman Catholics from Nikolsburg, Moravia (now Mikulov, Czech Republic). They had Schmid baptized and educated him in a Catholic elementary school. After graduation, he apprenticed as an electrician.

Schmid was drafted into the Austro-Hungarian Army in 1918 and survived intense battles during the retreat from Italy in the final months of World War I. He became an electrician and opened a small radio shop on Klosterneuburger Straße, Brigittenau, Vienna where he employed two Jews. Allegedly, as a young man he was in love with a Jewish girl. Schmid, who was married and had one daughter, did not belong to any organizations besides the Catholic Church.

Little else is known about Schmid's life before World War II. After the German annexation of Austria in 1938, Schmid made a citizen's arrest of a man who broke the window of a Jewish neighbor and helped some Jewish friends escape into nearby Czechoslovakia. After the outbreak of war upon the German invasion of Poland in September 1939, he was drafted into the German army, but was not expected to serve on the front lines due to his age. According to German historian Wolfram Wette, he was a "civilian in uniform" who did not conform to military culture.

Wette describes him as a non-ideological humanitarian whose opposition to Nazism stemmed purely from his respect for human life. According to Hermann Adler, one of the Jews whom Schmid rescued, he was a "simple sergeant" and "a socially awkward man in thought and speech" who did not read newspapers or books.

== Rescue actions in Vilnius ==
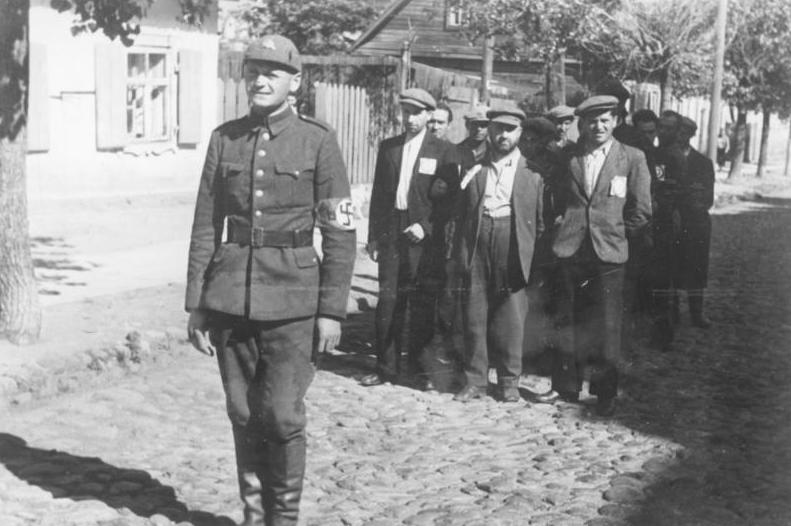
Lithuanian collaborator with Jewish prisoners, July 1941

At first he was stationed in Poland and Belarus. In late August 1941, after the invasion of the Soviet Union, he was transferred to the Landeswehr Battalion 898 in Vilnius, then part of the Reichskommissariat Ostland German occupation zone. Schmid was reassigned to an office called Feldkommandantur 814, whose personnel were charged with collecting German soldiers who had been separated from their units and reassigning them. Although Sgt. Schmid interrogated the soldiers strictly, he sympathized with them—many were in fact suffering from combat fatigue—and avoided charging them with offenses under German military law such as desertion or cowardice in the face of the enemy, which would have resulted in court martial and the death penalty.

During the first week of September 1941 alone, 3,700 Jews of Vilnius were rounded up and murdered, most at the Ponary killing pits outside of town. Schmid could see the collection point outside the window and witnessed scenes of great brutality. The first Jew whom he helped was Max Salinger, a Polish Jew from Bielsko Biala fluent in Polish and German; most likely Salinger approached Schmid. Schmid gave Salinger the paybook of Private Max Huppert, a Wehrmacht soldier who had been killed, and employed him as a typist in the office. Salinger survived the war.

The second Jew whom Schmid rescued was a 23-year-old Lithuanian Jewish woman named Luisa Emaitisaite. Emaitisaite had managed to dodge the roundups one day but was caught outside the ghetto after curfew, which was punishable by death. Hiding in a doorway, she saw Schmid walking past and begged for his help. Schmid hid her in his apartment temporarily and later hired her for the office, where her knowledge of several languages and stenography was helpful. Her work permit protected her and she also survived the war. These examples show that Schmid did not set out to help Jews, but instead that his rescue actions were driven by their appeals for help.

I want to tell you how this all came about. The Lithuanian military herded many Jews to a meadow outside of town and shot them, each time around two thousand to three thousand people. On their way they killed the children by hurling them against the trees, etc., you can imagine.

— Anton Schmid in a letter to his family, 9 April 1942 (Note: According to Schoeps, Schmid could not say that the Germans were responsible for the massacres because of military censorship. The full text of the letter is printed in Bartrop (2016, p. 352) and Wette (2014, p. 79).)

As part of the Wehrmacht policy of economic exploitation of conquered territories, a section was added for carpentry and upholstery, which Schmid directed. Due to the lack of willing, skilled Lithuanian workers, many Jews were employed. In October 1941, many permits were cancelled with a view to murdering many of the Jews in the ghetto.

Schmid's office, with 150 Jewish workers at the time, was only allocated 15 permits, which covered 60 Jews including holders and family members. The Jews called these certificates "leave from death papers" because they usually prevented the police and SS from rounding up and murdering the holders.

The other 90 Jews begged Schmid to drive them in Wehrmacht trucks to the nearby town of Lida, Belarus, where they believed that they would be safer. Schmid did so, temporarily saving them from death at Ponary, and made several trips to Lida with other Jews. Later, Schmid managed to obtain more of these life-saving permits and eventually employed 103 Jews in various jobs. According to testimony, Schmid treated his workers—both Jews and Soviet prisoners of war—humanely and even managed to rescue some who had been taken to Lukiškės Prison for execution.

From November 1941 until his arrest in January, Schmid hid Hermann Adler, a Bratislava-born Jewish resistance member, and his wife Anita under false papers in Schmid's apartment in Vilnius. Adler introduced Schmid to key figures in the Vilna Ghetto resistance movement, including Mordechai Tenenbaum, the leader of the 1943 Białystok Ghetto uprising, and Chaika Grossman. Schmid's apartment was used as a meeting place for Jewish partisans; during a meeting on New Year's Eve 1941, Tenenbaum made Schmid an honorary member of the Vilna Zionist Organization.

Schmid, Adler, and Tenenbaum devised a plan to rescue Jews from the Vilna Ghetto by transporting them to Białystok, Lida, and Grodno, considered to be safer. Under the pretext that he was moving necessary Jewish workers to the places where they were most needed, he transported some 300 Jews from Vilna. Although Schmid did aid the Jewish resistance movement where he could, the partisans in the Vilna Ghetto did not have weapons at this time, so Schmid did not help armed Jewish rebels.

We all must die. But if I can choose whether to die as a murderer or a helper, I choose death as a helper.

— Anton Schmid in a statement to Hermann Adler

Because of his aid to the Jewish resistance movement, Schmid was arrested at the end of January 1942 and imprisoned at Stefanska Prison in Vilnius. He was sentenced to death on 25 February and executed on 13 April. The trial record did not survive, so researchers are unsure who denounced him or exactly what offenses he was charged with. In his final letter to his family, Schmid wrote, "I have just acted as a human and I did not want to hurt anyone." He was one of only three Wehrmacht soldiers who were executed for helping Jews. By the summer of 1942, his office no longer employed any Jews. It is unknown how many Jews he managed to save, but the number has variously been estimated at 250 or 300.

== Commemoration and legacy ==
=== Austria ===
According to Schmid's widow, many of her neighbors called her late husband a traitor and someone smashed her windows. Austria did not recognize Schmid as a victim of Nazism until the late 1950s, which denied his widow and daughter financial support to which they would otherwise have been entitled. However, Salinger traveled to Vienna after the war and told Stefanie Schmid of what her husband had done, and attempted to support her financially.

In 1965, Simon Wiesenthal obtained Stefanie Schmid's address from a friend in Tel Aviv. The Simon Wiesenthal Center arranged for Schmid to travel to Vilnius with her daughter and son-in-law despite Communist travel restrictions and funded a new gravestone with the inscription "Here Rests A Man Who Thought It Was More Important To Help His Fellow Man Than To Live". On 11 December 1990, a memorial plaque was erected outside his home in Vienna and unveiled by Mayor Helmut Zilk. A street in Vienna was named after him in March 2003, and Kurier described him as "Austria's Oskar Schindler".

In January 2020, the Rossauer Barracks were renamed to Bernardis-Schmid-Kaserne.

=== Israel ===
During the few minutes it took Kovner to tell of the help that had come from a German sergeant, a hush settled over the courtroom; it was as though the crowd had spontaneously decided to observe the usual two minutes of silence in honor of the man named Anton Schmid. And in those two minutes, which were like a sudden burst of light in the midst of impenetrable, unfathomable darkness, a single thought stood out clearly, irrefutably, beyond question – how utterly different everything would be today in this courtroom, in Israel, in Germany, in all of Europe, and perhaps in all countries of the world, if only more such stories could have been told.

— Hannah Arendt, Eichmann in Jerusalem

A report on Schmid's New Year's Eve meeting with Jewish resistance members was carried by Jewish courier Lonka Koziebrodzka to the Warsaw Ghetto and preserved in the Ringelblum Archive. Already Schmid was described as one of the חֲסִידֵי אֻמּוֹת הָעוֹלָם (khasidei umót ha'olám, "Righteous Among the Nations").

The first published account of Schmid's rescue was in the prose poem Gesänge aus der Stadt des Todes ("Songs from the City of Death"), published in 1945 in Switzerland by Hermann Adler, who dedicated chapter eight to Schmid. Adler stated that the Jews in the ghetto said Kaddish for Schmid. According to Schoeps, Adler describes Schmid's rescue activities "in the manner of a saintly legend". Testimony about him from Tenenbaum and Yitzhak Zuckerman was included in the Scrolls of Fire.

Abba Kovner, a former member of the Vilna Ghetto resistance, testified about Schmid at the trial of Nazi war criminal Adolf Eichmann. It was from Schmid that Kovner first heard of Eichmann; Schmid told Kovner that he had heard a rumor that "there is one dog called Eichmann and he arranges everything". Kovner emphasized that Schmid had offered his help selflessly, without accepting any payment. In 1964, Yad Vashem, the official Israeli memorial to the Holocaust, awarded Schmid recognition as Righteous among the Nations for his efforts to save Jewish lives during the Holocaust. His widow traveled to Jerusalem for the ceremony and planted a tree in the Garden of the Righteous. Schmid was one of the first Germans or Austrians to be bestowed with this honor. Many Jews, including Simon Wiesenthal, have described Schmid as "like a saint".

=== Germany ===
The Bundeswehr's first official commemoration of a German soldier who had risked his life to save Jews during the Holocaust occurred on 8 May 2000, when it renamed a military base in Rendsburg "Feldwebel-Schmid-Kaserne" in honor of his courage. Schmid's name replaced that of General Günther Rüdel, a German officer who fought in both World Wars and sat as an honorary judge in Nazi People's Courts, which delivered summary verdicts ordering the execution of thousands of people following the 20 July plot to assassinate Adolf Hitler. However, later research found that Rüdel had only overseen one trial and advocated for acquittal. The renaming represented a sea change in German attitudes towards the Wehrmacht's role in the war that coincided with the opening of a controversial exhibition focusing on Wehrmacht criminality.

By invitation of German Federal Minister of Defense Rudolf Scharping, Austrian President Heinz Fischer attended the barracks naming ceremony as President of the National Council of Austria in Rendsburg. Scharping praised Schmid's "bravery and courage" and stated that he is a new example for the German soldier of today. In an indication of how disobedience to Nazi authorities was still a sensitive subject in Germany, he added that: "We are not free to choose our history, but we can choose the examples we take from that history." The commanding officer protested the removal of Rüdel's name and refused to attend. American historian Fritz Stern wrote that honoring Schmid "strengthens our democratic spirit" and is a repudiation of postwar attitudes in which German resistance was taboo. The barracks was closed down in 2010. On 22 June 2016, the Bundeswehr barracks in Blankenburg (Harz) were named after Schmid.

According to Schoeps, Schmid is "probably the most remarkable" of all the Wehrmacht rescuers in Vilnius, because he not only helped Jewish refugees but furthered Jewish resistance. Other Wehrmacht rescuers, such as Major Karl Plagge, worked within the system to save Jews. Wolfram Wette described Schmid as "one of the gold grains hidden under the heap of rubble" (Note: German: zu den Goldkörnen gehört, die unter dem grossen Schutthaufen) in the history of Nazi Germany, as there were so few Germans willing to risk their lives to help Jews. According to Wette, Schmid brings a "message of courageous humanity" (Note: German: Botschaft der mutigen Menschlichkeit) that can serve as a guide for Germany's present and future. Schmid was profiled in a Canton of Lucerne publication focusing on people who have exhibited civil courage.

Memorials for Anton Schmid

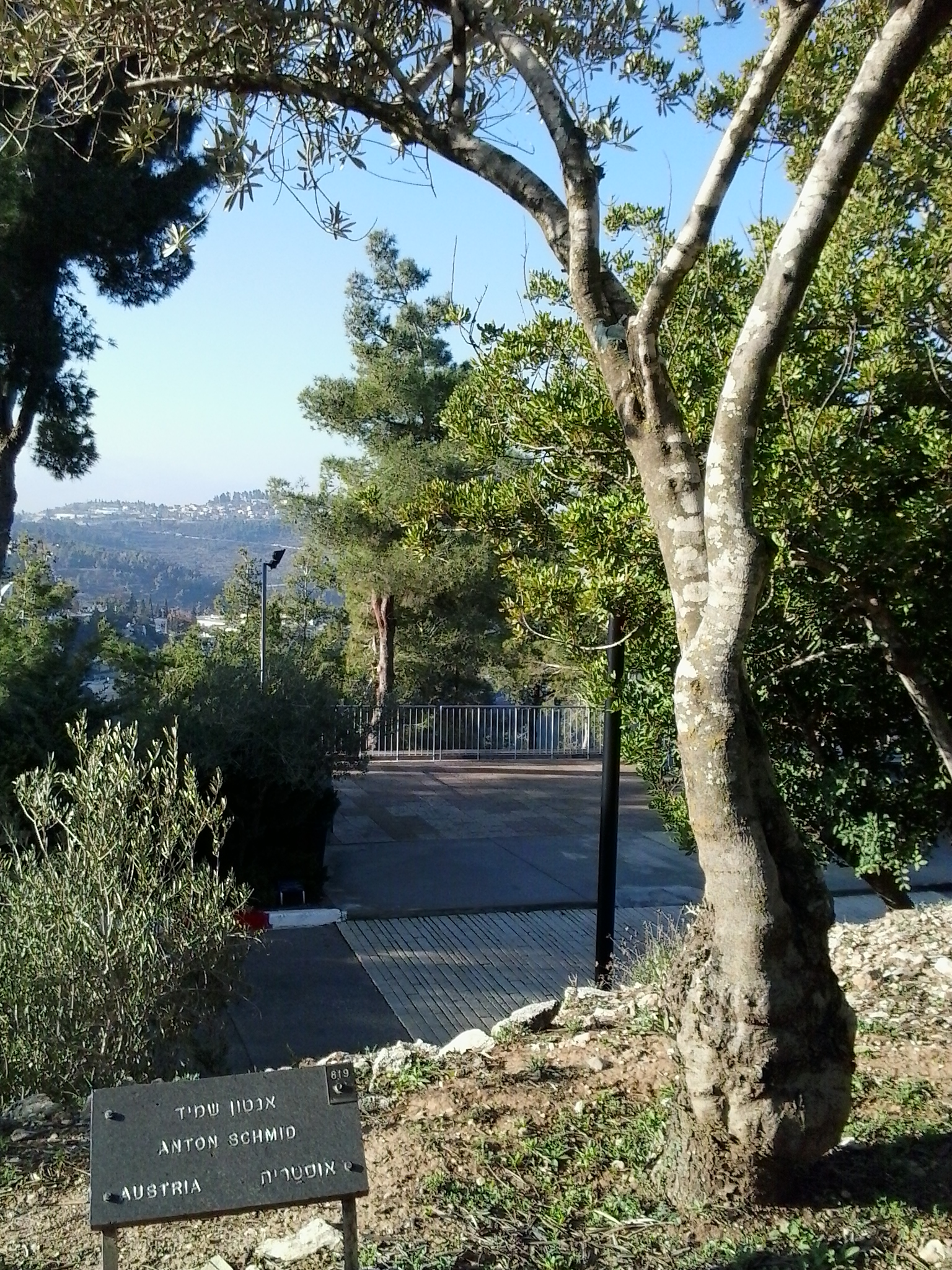
Tree in the Garden of the Righteous

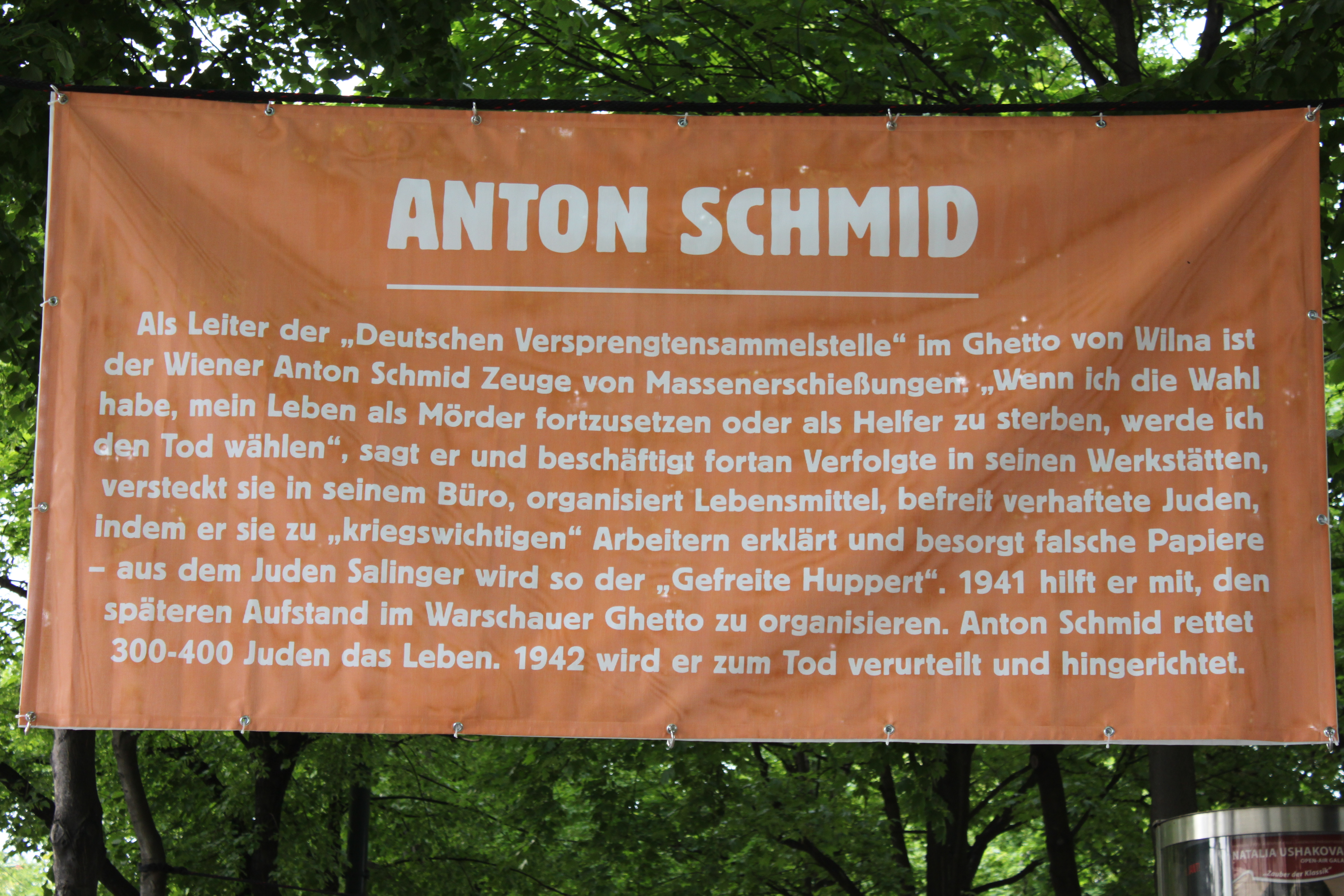
Sign at a memorial event in Austria in 2011

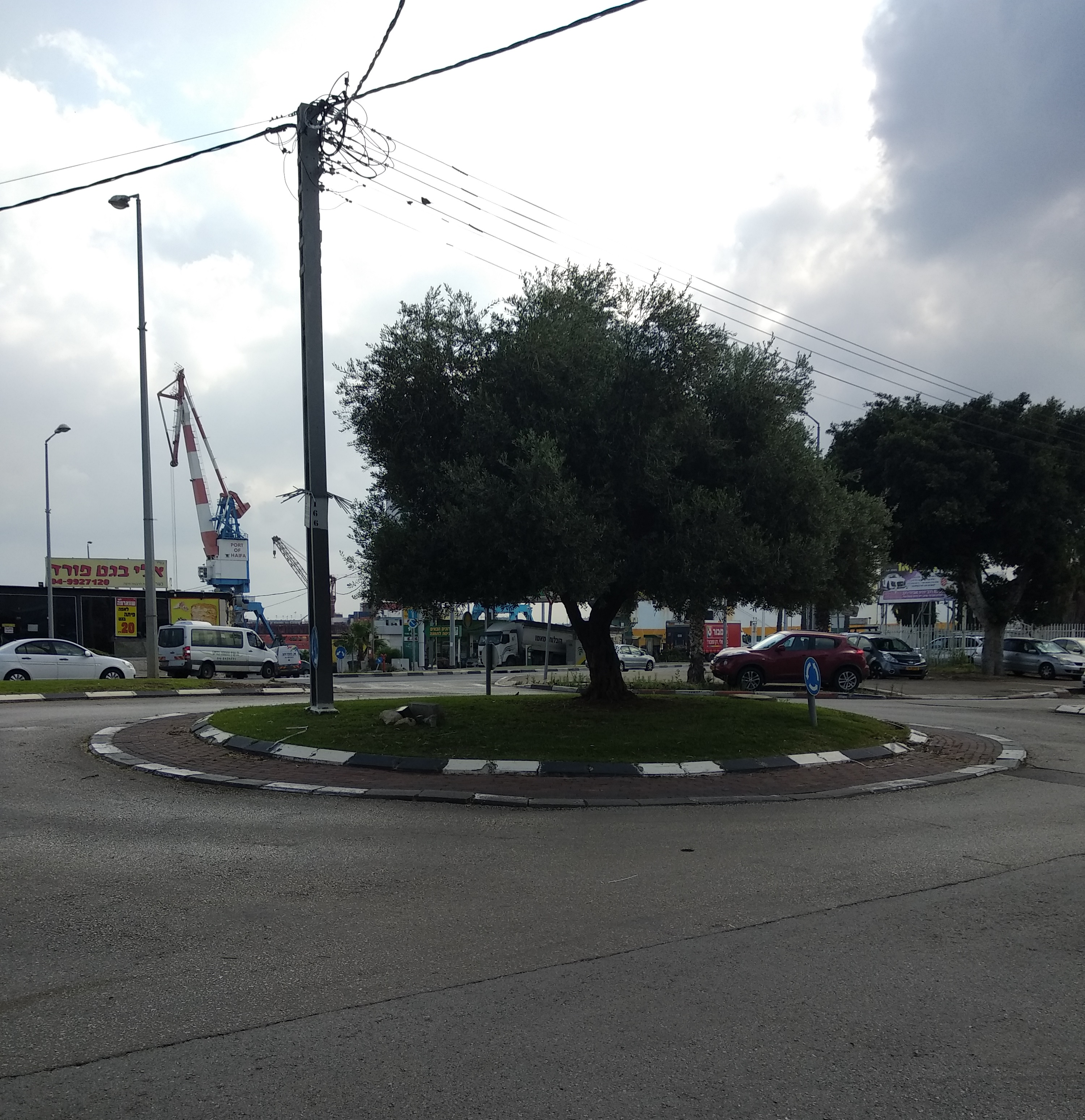
Roundabout in Haifa, Israel

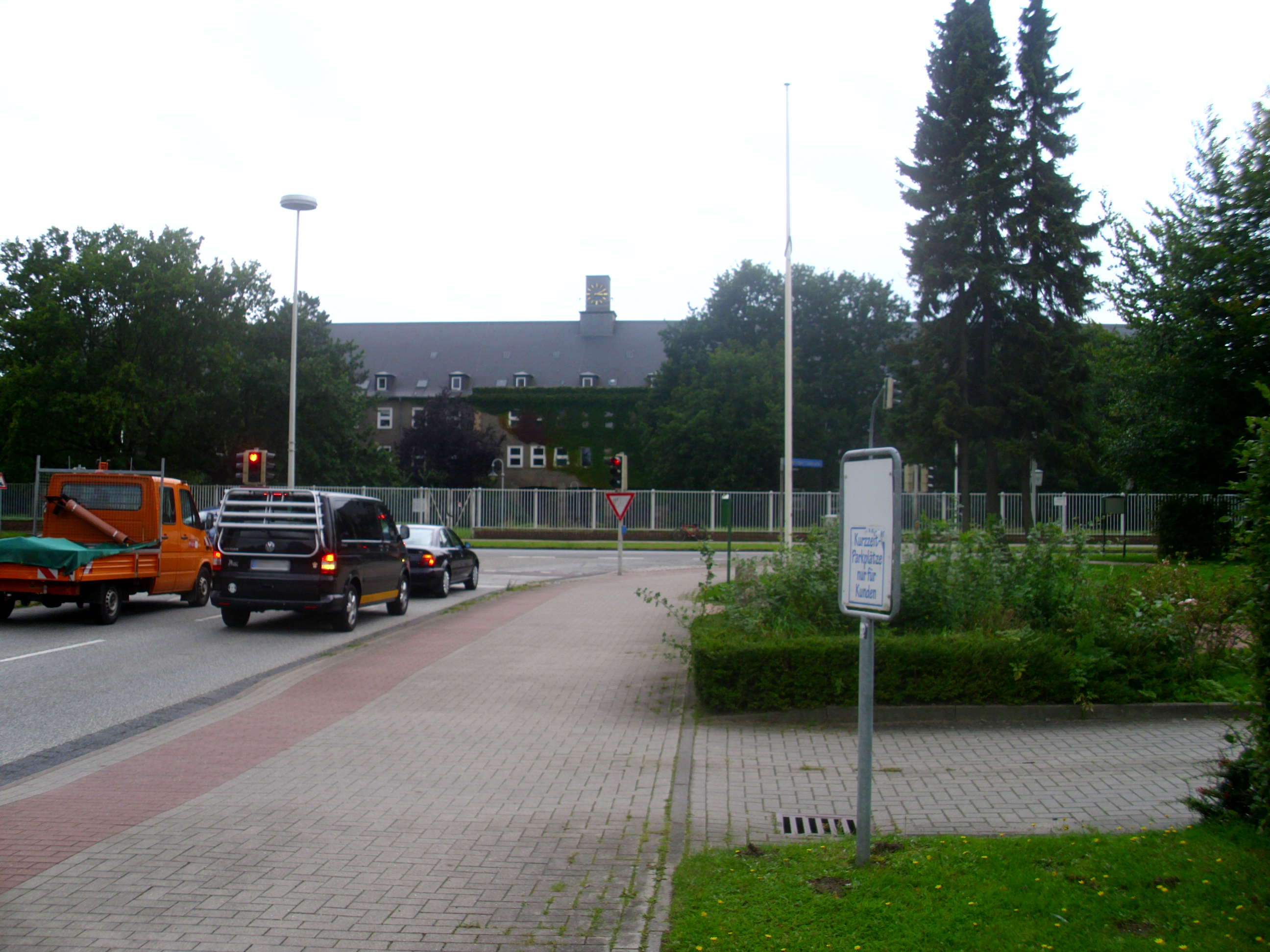
Feldwebel-Schmid-Kaserne, Rendsburg, Germany
