= Robert Lichal =

Austrian politician (1932–2024)

Robert Lichal (9 July 1932 – 25 April 2024) was an Austrian politician for the Austrian People's Party (ÖVP).

== Biography ==
Robert Lichal was born in Vienna, Austria on 9 July 1932. He graduated from high school in 1950 and subsequently went to Lower Austria. As a student he studied legal science, and in 1965, he earned a doctorate in law. As a so-called Weißer Jahrgang (a man born at a time that made him too old by the time Austria reintroduced compulsory military service in 1956), he never did military service.

Lichal politically engaged himself as an Austrian Workers Federation (ÖAAB) member and member of the public service trade (OGB). From 1987 to 1991, he was the Federal Chancellor of the ÖAAB.

From 1976 to 1979, Lichal was a member of the Federal Council of Austria. From 1979 to 1987, he was a deputy to the National Assembly of Austria. From 1987 to 1990, he held the post of defense minister at the Federal Ministry for National Defence and Sport. In his tenure, militia structure was enshrined in the Constitution and the Austrian Army received missiles. From 1990 to 1994, he was again member of parliament and the Second President-in-Office in the Second Republic.

Lichal was a member of the Catholic fraternities Ö.kaV Rhaeto-Danubia Vienna and K.Ö.HV Franco Bavaria Vienna, both in the Austrian Cartellverband, and the Catholic Fraternity K.Ö.St.V. Austria Purkersdorf in the Mittelschüler-Kartellverband.

Lichal died on 25 April 2024, at the age of 91.

== Oerlikon Scandal ==
In 1987, it became known according to a report in a news magazine profile that Lichal had an order for 50,000 pieces of tracer practice ammunition for antiaircraft guns worth 35 million Austrian schilling that had been awarded to the Swiss manufacturer Rheinmetall Air Defence, although the French supplier Matra Manurhin Défense an offer for 15 million Schillings. At the time of the award, the Bundesheer had ammunition reserves of two years. Lichal had ordered the Bundesheer at least three times to pass the more favorable offer from Matra. In 1988, a criminal investigation for abuse of authority was introduced, which included house searches at Lichal's home, his secretaries Michael Spindelegger and Walter Schön home's, and the then Oerlikon-General representatives in Austria's homes'. Lichal and Schön were close friends and Spindelegger was a member of Cartellverband. One sticky note found read "2 party financing; and two million: Value of contract: 35 million Spindelegger: 1". Prosecutors suspected an illegal party financing for the ÖVP, after which was considered non-partisan, but the ÖVP Minister of Justice Egmont Foregger initiated disciplinary proceedings against the investigating prosecutor and the case of the Supreme Public Prosecutor that rendered the investigations invalid in 1990.
