= Klaudia Tanner =

Austrian politician (born 1970)

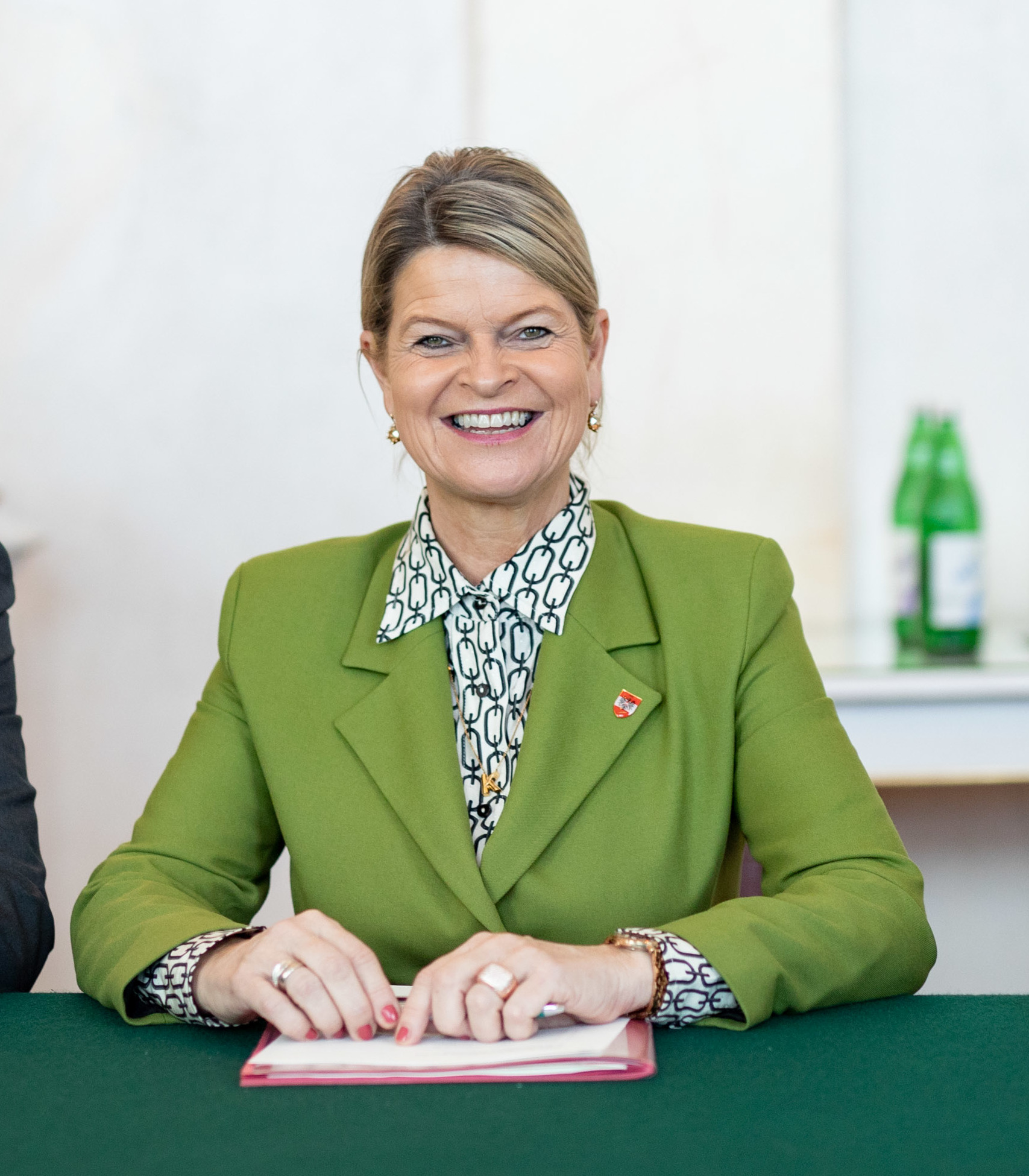
- Portrait, 2020

Minister of Defense
- Incumbent
- Assumed office 7 January 2020
- Chancellor: Sebastian Kurz; Alexander Schallenberg; Karl Nehammer; Christian Stocker
- Preceded by: Thomas Starlinger

Member of the Landtag of Lower Austria
- In office 22 March 2018 – 7 January 2020

Personal details
- Born: 2 May 1970 (age 55) Scheibbs, Austria
- Party: People's Party
- Spouse: Martin Tanner
- Children: 1
- Education: University of Vienna

Klaudia Tanner (née Wallner, born 2 May 1970) is an Austrian politician of the People's Party (ÖVP) who has been serving as the minister of defense in the governments of Chancellors Sebastian Kurz, Alexander Schallenberg, Karl Nehammer, and Christian Stocker since January 2020. From 2011 to 2020, she worked as the General Manager of Austria's political farmers' association.

== Early life and education ==
Tanner was born in the small town of Scheibbs in Lower Austria. Early in her career, she worked in the cabinet of Minister of the Interior Ernst Strasser from 2001 to 2003 and for IT company Kapsch BusinessCom, a subsidiary of Kapsch from 2003 to 2010.

== Political career ==
Already in the negotiations on a coalition government under Chancellor Sebastian Kurz following the 2017 elections, Tanner was considered as potential cabinet minister.

After the 2019 elections, Tanner was appointed Minister of Defense by Kurz in January 2020, making her the first woman to hold the position.

Under Tanner's leadership, Austria mobilized its military reservists for the first time since World War Two, asking them to fight the COVID-19 pandemic by helping with food supplies, medical support and police operations. Her ministry also ordered 18 Leonardo AW169M helicopters in a deal with Italy in September 2020, replacing its fleet of 50-year-old Aérospatiale Alouette III helicopters.

== Criticism ==
In April 2026 the Austrian Court of Audit criticized the defense department's Black Hawk transport helicopter modernization and acquisition program.

== Personal life ==
Tanner lives in Gresten. She is married and has a daughter.

Political offices
Preceded by Thomas Starlinger	Minister of Defense; 2020–present	Incumbent
