= Rossauer Barracks =

Building in Vienna, Austria

Coordinates: 48°13′07″N 16°22′06″E

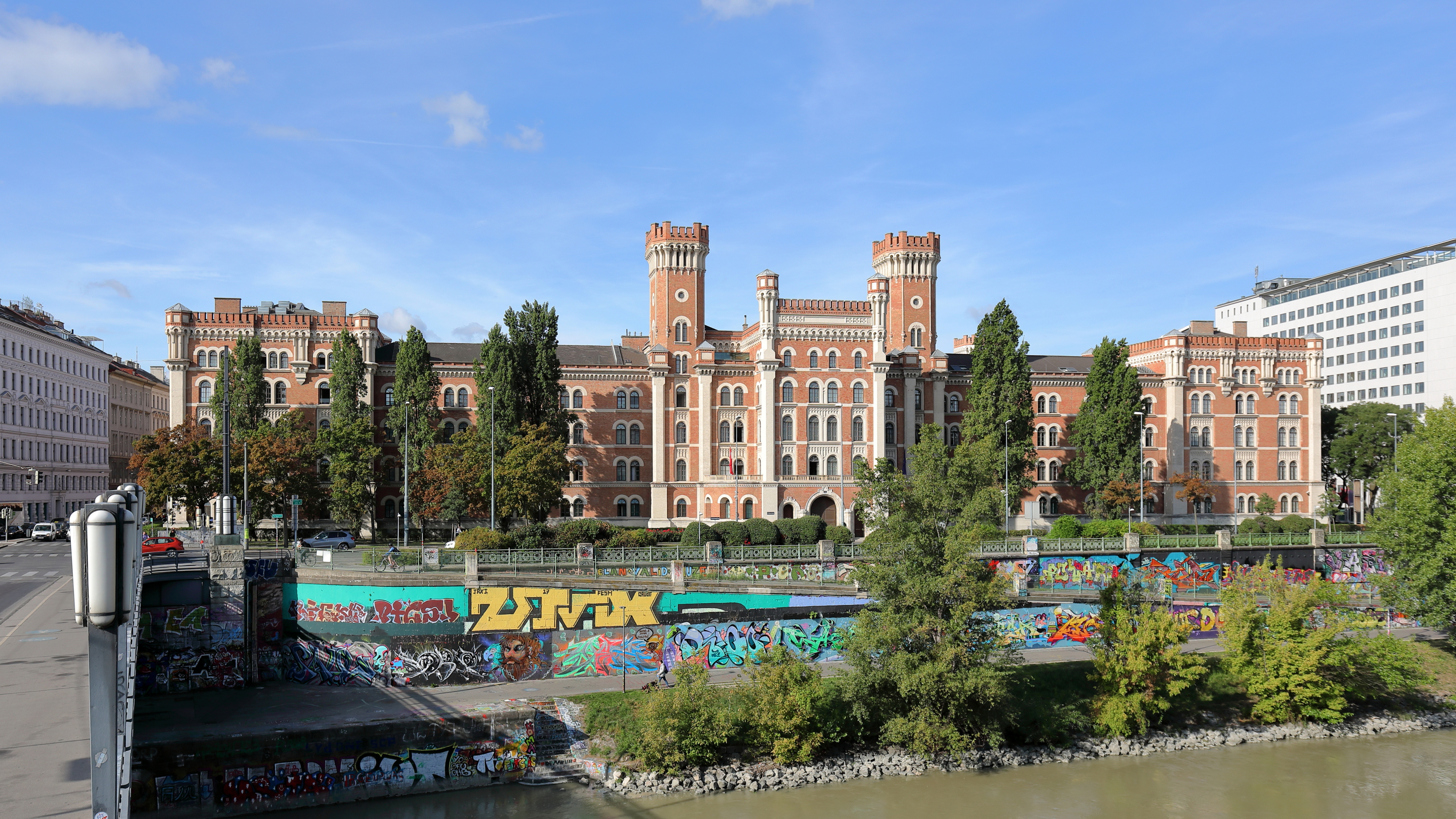
The Rossauer Barracks as seen from the other side of the Donaukanal.

The Rossauer Barracks (German: Rossauer Kaserne) is a barracks in the 9th district of Vienna, in the Alsergrund quarter of the city. It serves as the headquarters of the Defense Ministry.

In January 2020 the Rossauer Barracks were renamed the Bernardis-Schmid-Kaserne.

== History ==
It was built as the Crown Prince Rudolf Barracks (Kronprinz-Rudolf-Kaserne, named after Rudolf, Crown Prince of Austria), at the same time as the Franz-Joseph-Kaserne and Arsenal, as part of an overall approach to protect the city in the aftermath of the 1848 Revolution.
