= Ministry of Defence (Austria) =

Government ministry of Austria

Federal Ministry of Defence
- Bundesministerium für Landesverteidigung

Federal Ministry overview
- Formed: 15 July 1956; 69 years ago
- Preceding Federal Ministry: Imperial and Royal Ministry of War
- Jurisdiction: Government of Austria
- Status: Highest federal authority
- Headquarters: Rossauer Barracks, Vienna
- Annual budget: €2.288 billion (2019)
- Minister responsible: Klaudia Tanner
- Federal Ministry executive: Robert Brieger, Chief of the General staff
- Website: www.bundesheer.at

The Federal Ministry of Defence (German: Bundesministerium für Landesverteidigung, sometimes shortened to BMLV or Verteidigungsministerium) of Austria is the ministry in charge of all matters relating to military affairs, especially the Austrian Armed Forces. It is Austria's ministry of defence. Its current minister is Klaudia Tanner.

== Authority ==
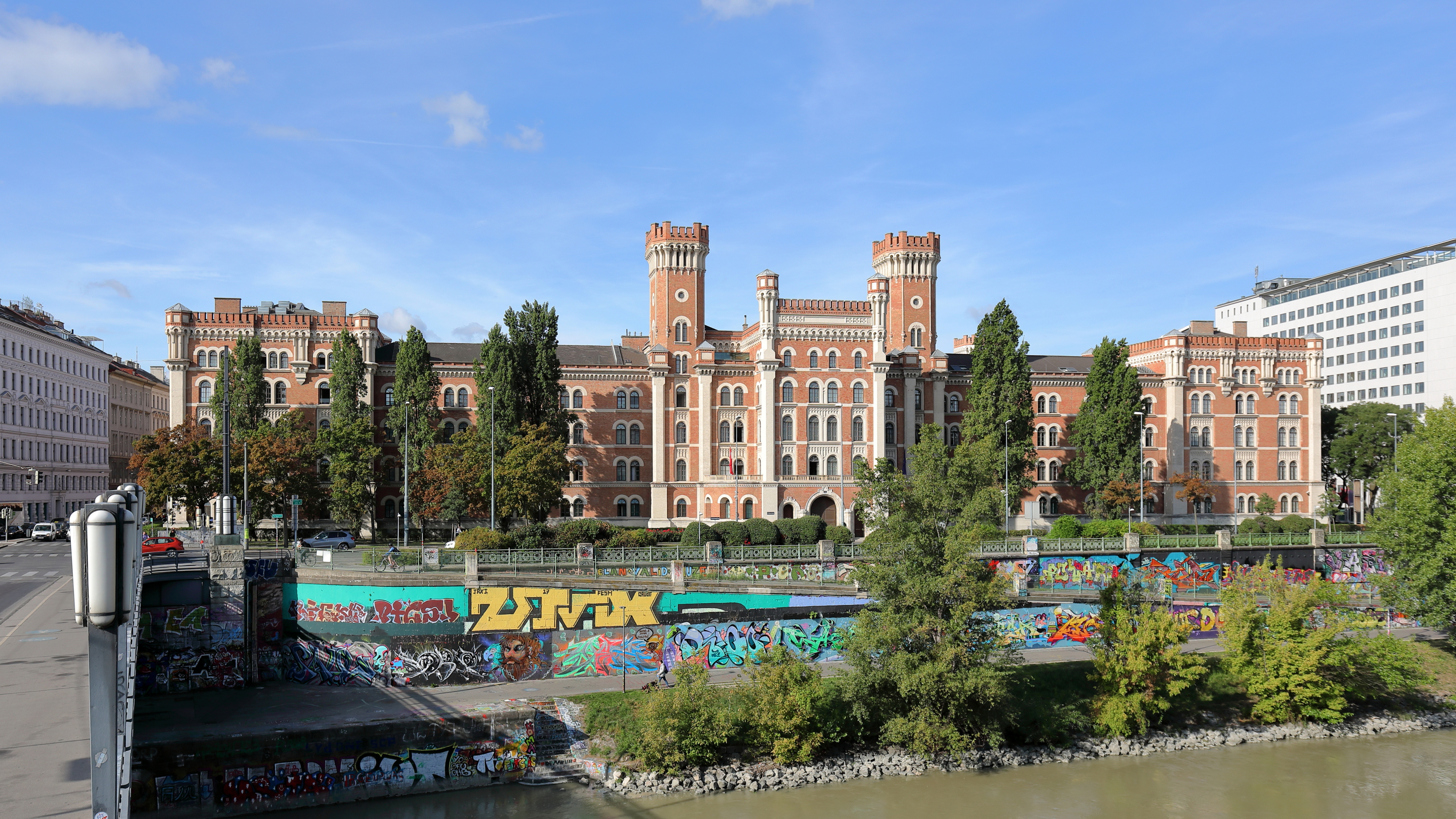
The Ministry of Defence's headquarters in the Rossauer Kaserne in Vienna.

The minister is head of all the ministry's subordinate authorities and is the supreme military commander of the Austrian Armed Forces. For certain acts, such as deployment of more than 5,000 men of the militia or reserve, the minister for defence's authorization is bound to the president of Austria, since in these cases the constitutional command of the army takes precedence.

== Responsibilities ==
Specifically, the Ministry is responsible for matters regarding:

- the armed forces' constitutionally defined duties
- the armed forces' operational and tactical leadership
- military aviation
- the provision of arms, equipment, materiel and personnel to the armed forces
- weapons, ammunition and munitions
- military technology, including weapons testing and military-technical research
- military restricted areas
- care of the armed forces' health, including military hospitals and supply of medicines
- military attachés
- the establishment, maintenance and management of all military buildings, facilities and properties owned by the state, the ministry building, the military administration or the army, including the Military History Museum, known as the Heeresgeschichtlichen Museum
- shipping, road transport, telecommunications and mapping in the military field
- the running of the Military History Museum, known as the Heeresgeschichtliches Museum (Militärhistorisches Institut).
- the armed forces' finances
- the army forest at Allentsteig
- management of Austria's shares in the SIVBEG (Strategische Immobilien Verwertungs-, Beratungs- und Entwicklungsgesellschaft) as long as the federal government is a shareholder, and the regulation of that company.
- the European Defence Agency

== Office holders ==
- Minister: Klaudia Tanner
- Head of the Minister's Cabinet: Stefan Kammerhofer
- Chief of Staff of the Minister's Cabinet: Brigadier (1 Star General) Jürgen Ortner
- Chief of the General Staff (Head of the entire Austrian Bundesheer): General Othmar Commenda
  - Deputy Chief of Staff: Generalleutnant / Lieutenant General (3 Star General) Bernhard Bair
- Head of Section I (Zentralsektion or Central Section): Sektionschef / Head of Section, Mr. Christian Kemperle
- Head of Section II (Planung or Planning): Generalleutnant / Lieutenant General (3 Star General) Franz Leitgeb
- Head of Section III (Bereitstellung or Supply): Generalleutnant / Lieutenant General (3 Star General) Norbert Gehart
- Head of Section IV (Einsatz or Mission): Generalleutnant / Lieutenant General (3 Star General) Karl Schmidseder
- Head of Section V (Sport): Samo Kobenter

== Subordinate departments ==
Subordinate to the ministry are the:

- Streitkräfteführungskommando (Supreme Command): Generalleutnant / Lieutenant General (3 Star General) Franz Reißner
  - Stellvertretender Kommandant (Deputy Commander): Generalmajor / Major General Dieter Heidecker
- Kommando Einsatzunterstützung (Operations Support Command): Brigadier (1 Star General) Andreas Pernsteiner
- Führungsunterstützungszentrum (Leadership Support Center): Brigadier (1 Star General) Andreas Wochner
- Ämter (Offices):
  - Armed forces personnel office: Hofrätin / Councillor, Mrs. Brigitte Habermayer-Binder
  - Armed forces' building and surveying office : Hofrat / Councillor Johannes Sailer
  - Office for armaments and procurement: Brigadier (1 Star General) Christian Tauschitz
  - Office for armaments and military technology: Brigadier (1 Star General) Michael Janisch
  - Heeresnachrichtenamt (Army Intelligence Office): Generalmajor / Major General Edwin Potocnik
  - Abwehramt (Defence Agency): Generalmajor / Major General Anton Oschep
- Academies:
  - Landesverteidigungsakademie (National Defence Academy): Generalleutnant / Lieutenant General Erich Csitkovits
  - Theresianische Militärakademie (Theresa Military Academy): Generalmajor / Major General Norbert Sinn
  - Heeresunteroffiziersakademie (Army Non-Commissioned Officers' Academy): Brigadier (1 Star General) Nikolaus Egger
- Weapons training and technical schools:
  - ABC-Abwehrschule (ABC - Defence School): Oberst / Colonel Michael Schuster
  - Heerestruppenschule (Army Soldiers / Troops School): Oberst dG / Colonel of the General Staff, Jürgen Baranyai
  - Flieger- und Fliegerabwehrschule (Flight and Air Defence School): Brigadier (1 Star General) Günther Schiefert
  - Heereslogistikschule (Army Logistics School): Brigadier (1 Star General) Dieter Jocham
  - Führungsunterstützungsschule (Leadership Support School): Oberst / Colonel Christian Wally
- Militärmedizinisches Zentrum (Military Medical Centre): Brigadier (1 Star General) Eugen Gallent
- Entminungsdienst / Demining Service Department
- Heeresgeschichtliches Museum / Museum of Military History, Vienna: Christian Ortner

== Historical development ==
Defence and sport were combined in the same ministry from 2009 till 2018.

=== Defence Ministry ===
Previous to 1918, there was a Ministry of War for the whole of Austria-Hungary and a Ministry of Defence solely for the Austrian half of the empire. The defence ministry took on various names during the First Austrian Republic of 1918 to 1938, and was abolished during Nazi Germany's annexation of Austria from 1938 to 1945. During the Allied occupation of Austria from 1945 to 1956, the defence agenda was in the remit of the "Office for National Defence", a section in the Federal Chancellery.

=== Sports Ministry ===
Sport first became a government portfolio in Austria in 1966, as part of the remit of the Federal Ministry of Education, which in 1984 was renamed the Federal Ministry of Education, Arts and Sports. In 1991 sport was moved to the Federal Ministry of Health, Sport and Consumer Protection, then in 1995 to the Federal Chancellery, in 2000 to the Federal Ministry of the Civil Service and Sports, in 2003 back to the Federal Chancellery and in 2009 joined the Federal Ministry of Defence and Sports. In 2018, the sports agenda was moved to the Ministry of Civil Service and Sport.
