= Filzmoos =

- Municipality
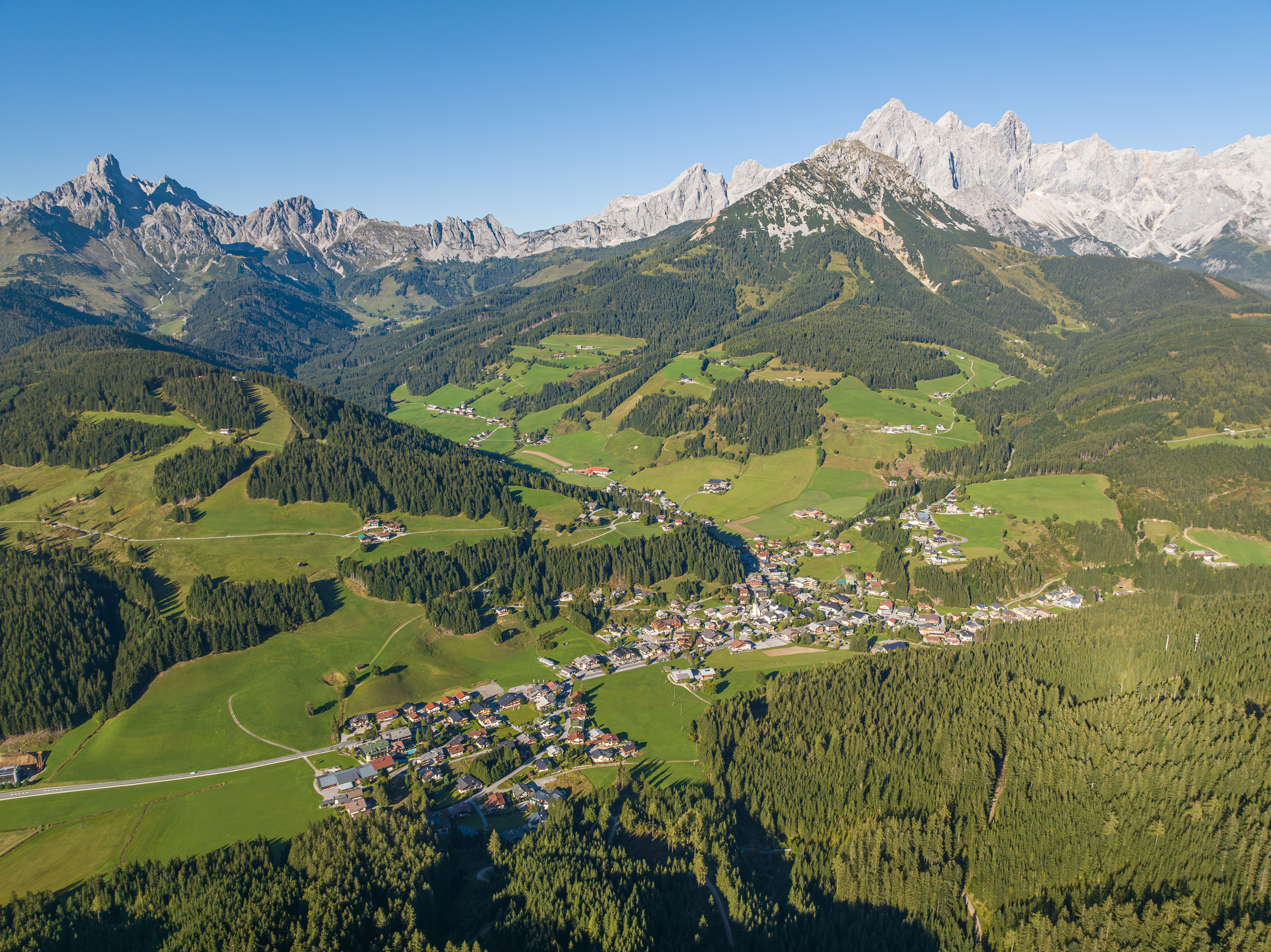
- Aerial view

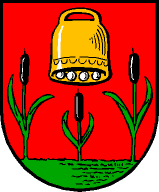
- Coat of arms

- Location within Austria
- Coordinates: 47°26′N 13°31′E
- Country: Austria
- State: Salzburg
- District: St. Johann im Pongau

Government
  - Mayor: Christian Mooslechner (SPÖ)

Area
  - Total: 75.71 km^{2} (29.23 sq mi)
- Elevation: 1,057 m (3,468 ft)

Population (2018-01-01)
  - Total: 1,484
  - Density: 19.60/km^{2} (50.77/sq mi)
- Time zone: UTC+1 (CET)
  - Summer (DST): UTC+2 (CEST)
- Postal code: 50 407
- Area code: 06453
- Website: https://www.filzmoos.salzburg.at/

Filzmoos is a town within the district of St. Johann im Pongau in the state of Salzburg, Austria. Its main income comes through tourism: skiing in winter and hiking in summer. The town is approximately 1 km above sea level. Since 2024, Filzmoos has been home to the International Austrian Yukigassen Championships.

== Location ==
Filzmoos sits below the Gosaukamm mountain range, with the nearest major peak being the Bischofsmütze (Bishop's Mitre), so named due to the shape of its double summit. The mountain itself is a popular objective for climbers. Northeast of the town is the Dachstein massif.

== Gallery ==
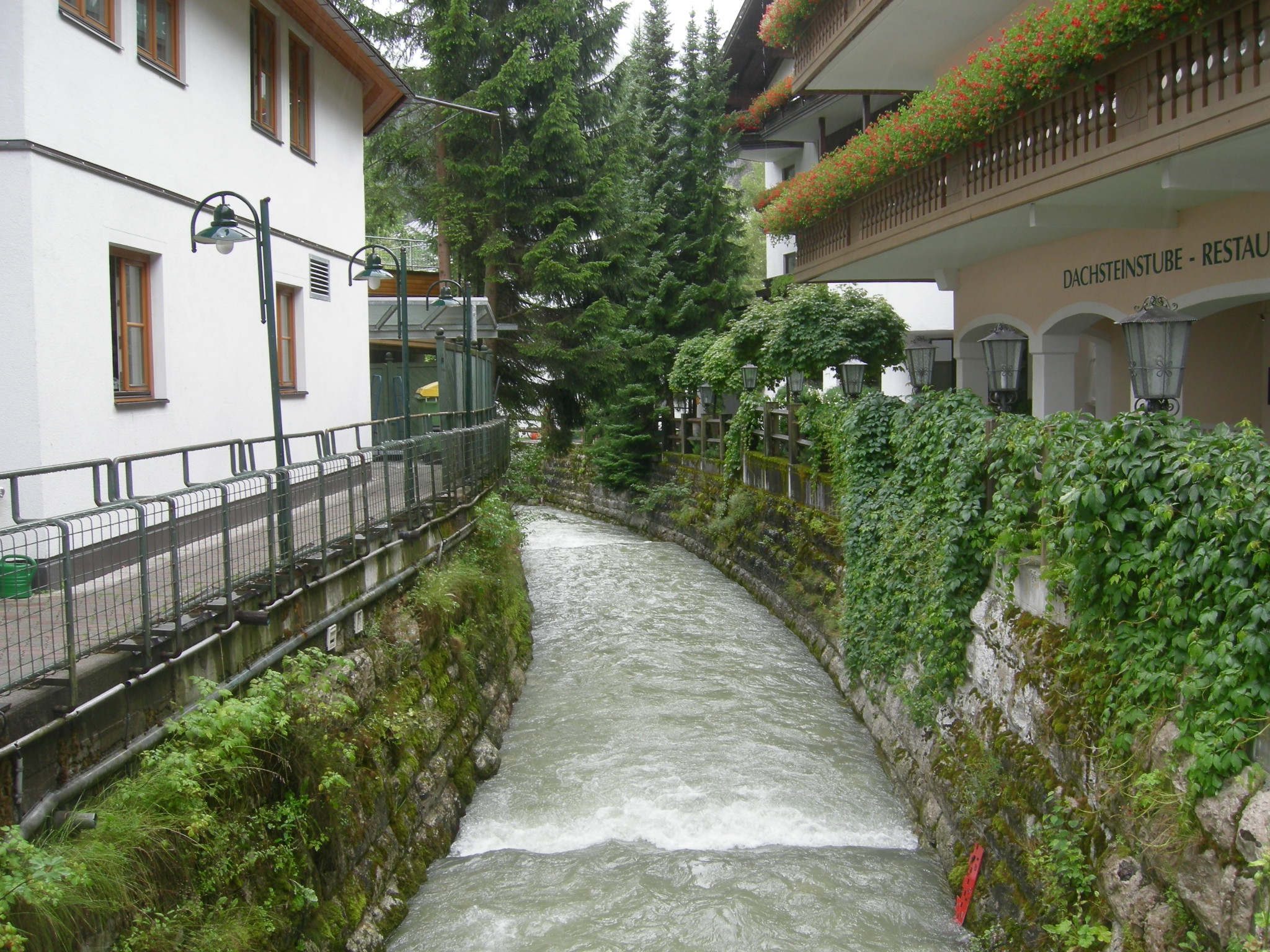
The river Warme Mandling

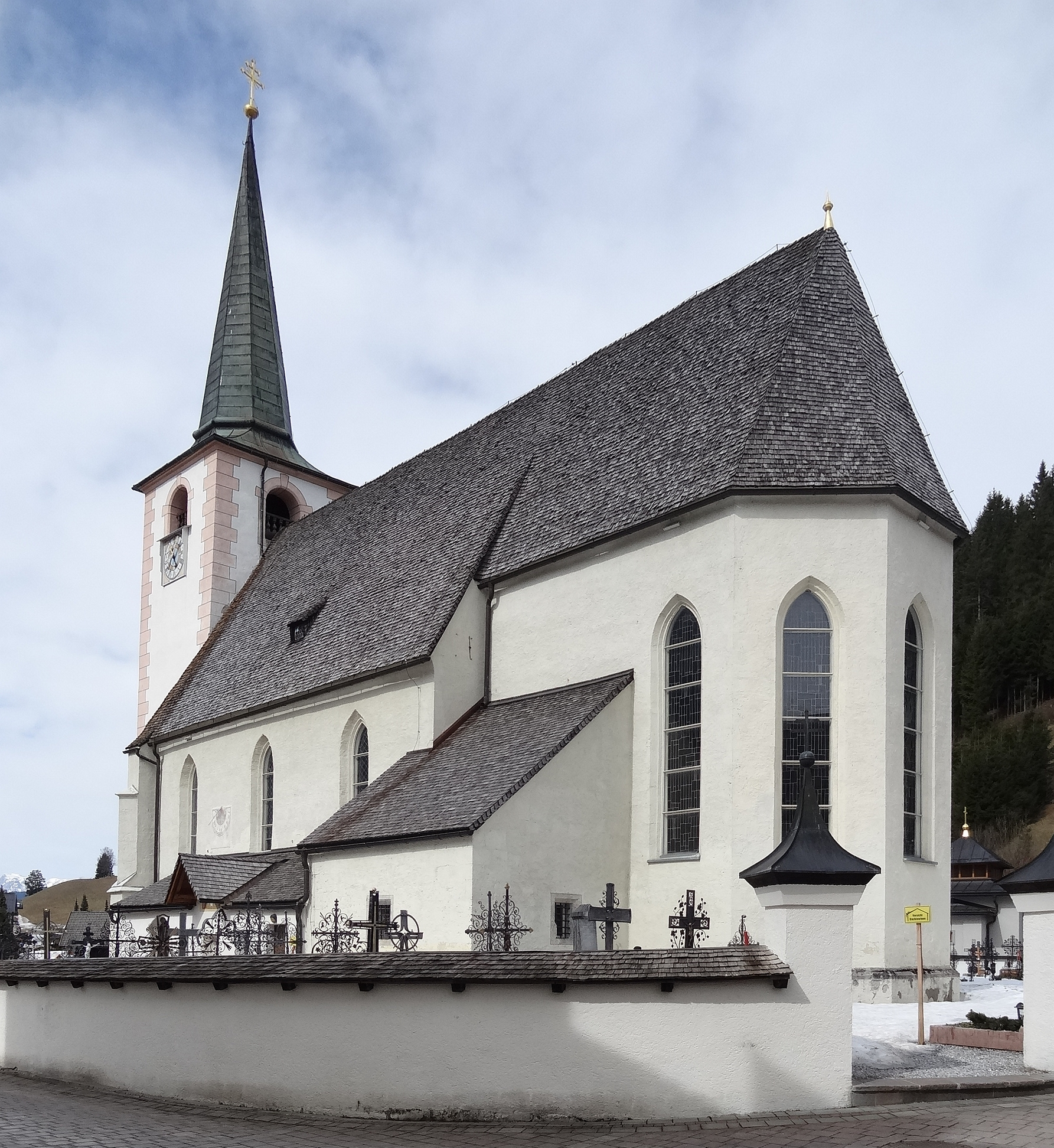
Saints Peter and Paul Church

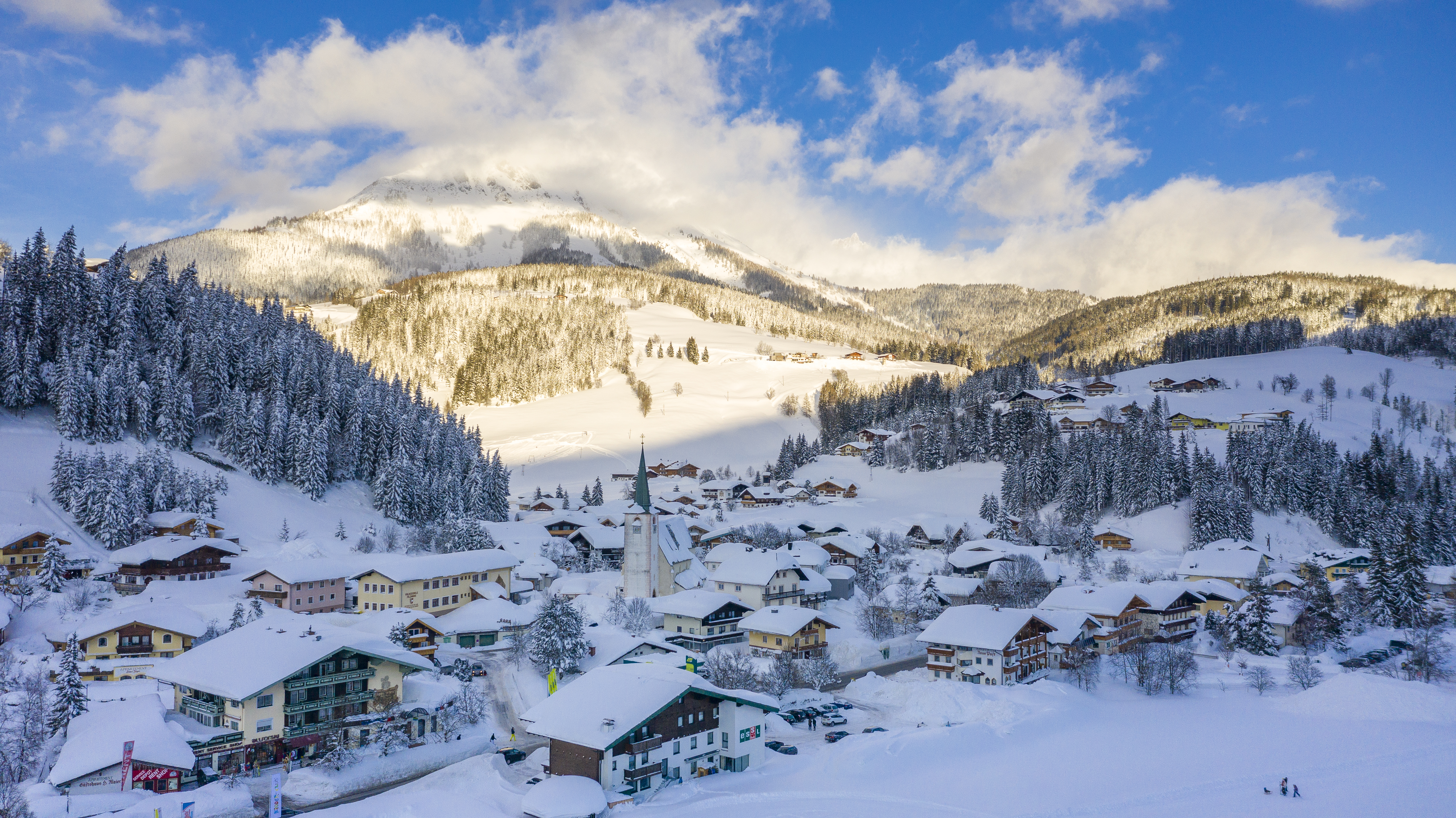
Filzmoos in winter

=== Notable people ===
- Brigitte Totschnig, former Austrian alpine skier, was born in the town.
- Michaela Kirchgasser, former world slalom skiing silver medalist grew up in Filzmoos and still lives there.
