= Gosaukamm =

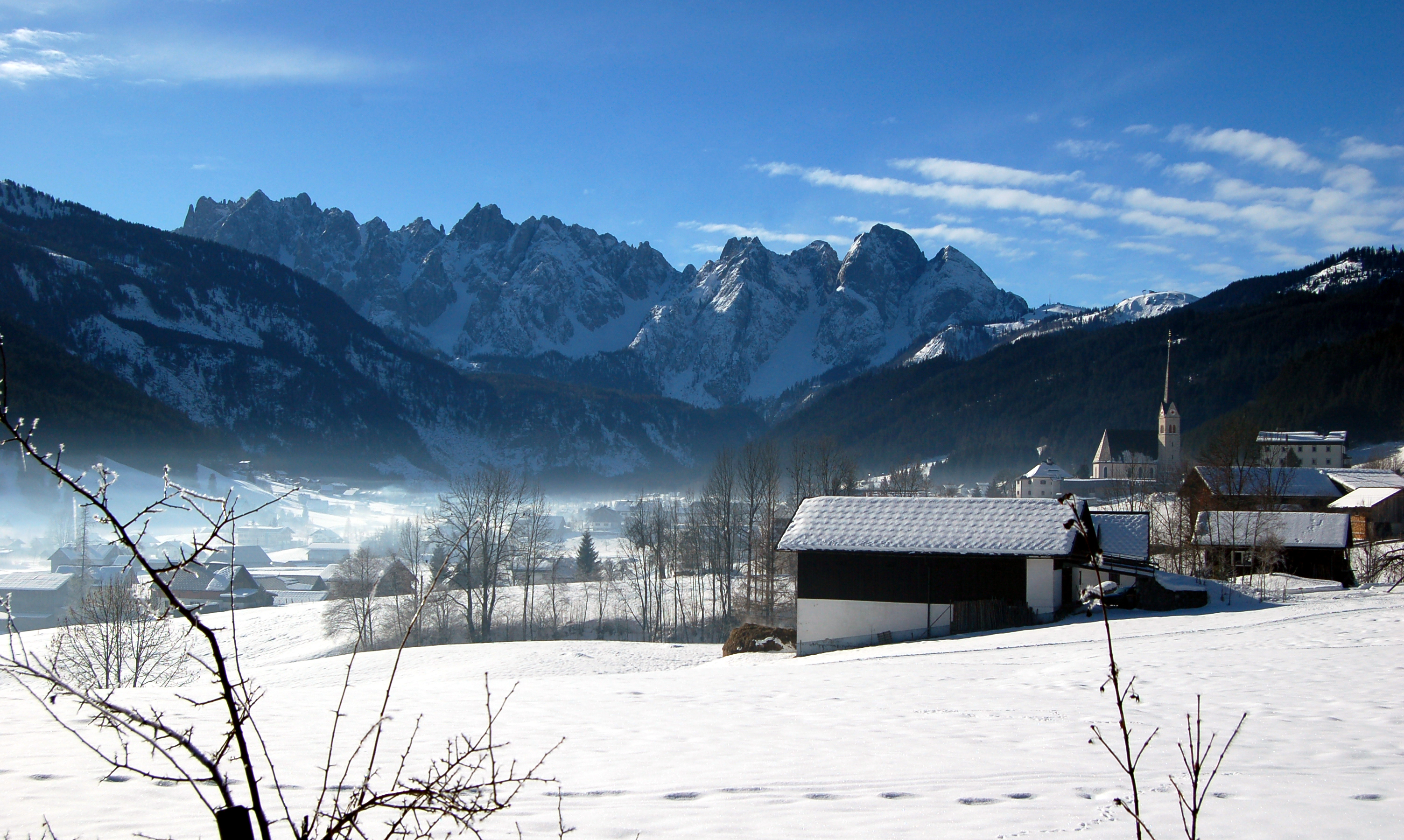
- The north side of the Gosaukamm as viewed from Gosau

Highest point
- Peak: Große Bischofsmütze
- Elevation: 2,458 m (8,064 ft)
- Coordinates: 47°30′50″N 13°29′50″E

Geography
- Location within Austria
- Location: Salzburg / Upper Austria, Austria
- Parent range: Northern Limestone Alps

UNESCO World Heritage Site
- Part of: Hallstatt-Dachstein / Salzkammergut Cultural Landscape
- Criteria: Cultural: (iii)(iv)
- Reference: 806
- Inscription: 1997 (21st Session)

The Gosaukamm is an Austrian mountain chain within the Dachstein range of the Northern Limestone Alps. Although relatively short in length, the chain forms an imposing backdrop to the valley and town of Gosau. Its highest point reaches an elevation of 2,458 metres (8,064 ft).

== Geography ==
The main ridge of the Gosaukamm forms the border between the Austrian states of Salzburg and Upper Austria. Part of the Dachstein Massif; it is located northwest of the Hoher Dachstein summit and forms part of the UNESCO World Heritage Site Hallstatt-Dachstein/Salzkammergut Cultural Landscape The Vorderer Gosausee lies along the northern side on its base. The range consists of multiple peaks, the highest of which being the Große Bischofsmütze at 2,458 metres (8,064 ft).

A via ferrata suspended ladder which spans a gorge on Grosser Donnerkogel has become a popular attraction for alpine tourists.

== Notable Peaks ==
Moving along the ridge from northwest in the southeastern direction, some of the notable peaks are:

- Kleiner Donnerkogel (1,920 metres (6,300 ft))
- Großer Donnerkogel (2,054 metres (6,739 ft))
- Steinriesenkogel (2,008 metres (6,588 ft))
- Strichkogel (2,036 metres (6,680 ft))
- Angerstein (2,100 metres (6,900 ft))
- Mandlkogel (2,279 metres (7,477 ft))
- Wasserkarkogel (2,268 metres (7,441 ft))
- Sternkogel (2,320 metres (7,610 ft))
- Großwand (2,415 metres (7,923 ft))
- Däumling (2,322 metres (7,618 ft))
- Armkarwand (2,348 metres (7,703 ft))
- Stuhllochspitze (2,172 metres (7,126 ft))
- Große Bischofsmütze (2,458 metres (8,064 ft))
- Kleine Bischofsmütze (2,430 metres (7,970 ft))
- Kamplbrunnspitze (2,190 metres (7,190 ft))

== See also ==
- Eastern Alps
- Limestone Alps
