= Puckinger See =

Lake in Austria

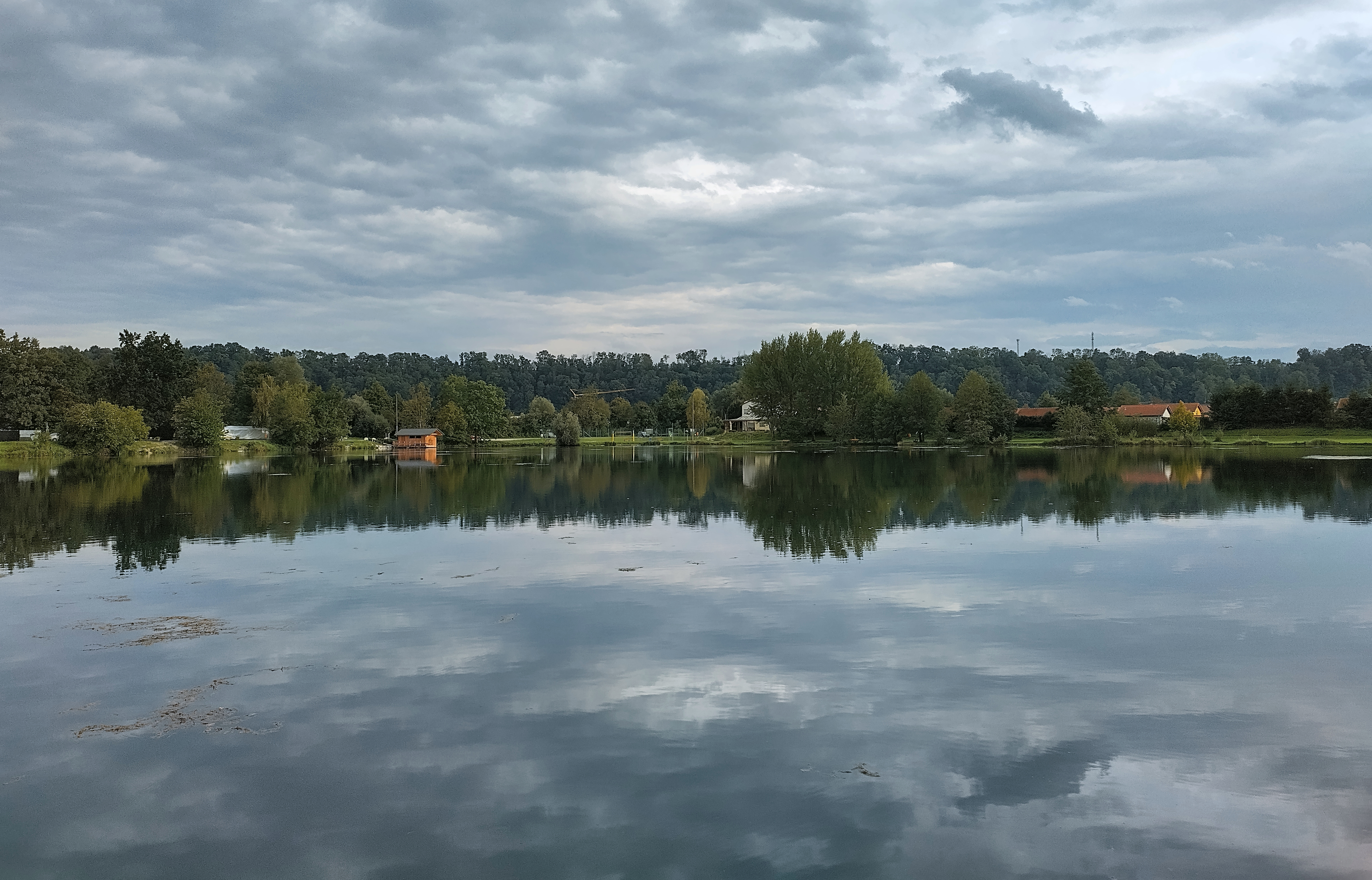
- The Puckinger See (Lake Pucking)

- Location within Austria
- Location: Pucking, Upper Austria, Austria
- Coordinates: 48°11′41″N 14°11′44″E
- Type: Artificial lake
- Primary inflows: groundwater
- Primary outflows: none
- Surface area: 6 hectares (15 acres)
- Average depth: 4 metres (13 ft)
- Max. depth: 6.6 metres (22 ft)
- Surface elevation: 280 metres (920 ft)

Puckinger See is a lake of Upper Austria. It is primarily used for recreation.

The Puckinger See (or Lake Pucking) is an artificial local recreation area east of the town of Pucking, located near Linz. It includes a swimming area, a small lawn for sunbathing, tennis courts, an allotment garden, a sports center with a climbing hall and a beach volleyball court.

== Background ==
As with many lakes in the Linz area, the gravel deposits in the area of today's Puckinger See served construction projects. Around 40,000 cubic meters of material was removed during the construction of the A25 Welser autobahn (formerly Linz autobahn) between the Haid (Ansfelden) and Wels junctions. The Puckinger See is the result of the pit filling with water. The lake is fed from the groundwater flow of the nearby Traun river.

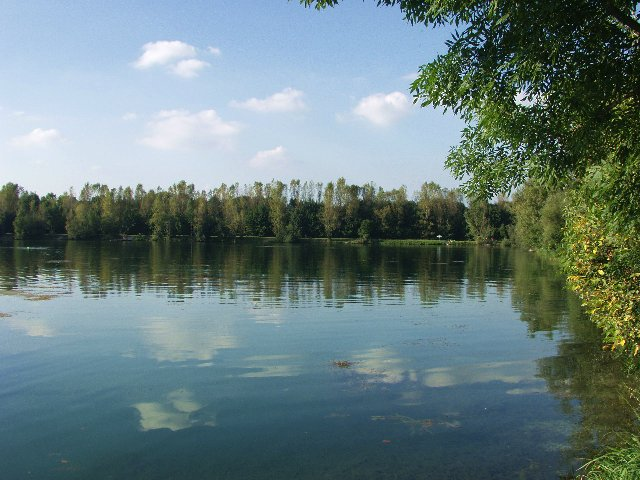
Puckinger See in the Linz-Land District on a late summer afternoon

== Current Uses as a Recreation Area ==
The Puckinger See is now used as a local recreation area. Due to its location next to the A25, from which it is separated by a strip of lawn and trees only around 150 meters wide, the noise pollution is higher and more constant than, for example, at Lake Pichlinger, which the Westbahn passes by. Although the water has bathing quality, the noise level, dense vegetation of aquatic plants, and the steep embankments mar the bathing pleasure.

The lake has an average depth of 4 meters and its bottom is densely overgrown. The fish population is varied, including carp, zander, catfish and even paddlefish in the water, which can be as warm as 25 degrees Celsius in the summer.

On the east bank there are facilities for curling, beach volleyball, soccer fields and sanitary facilities. There is also a climbing hall and allotment gardens. Along the western side of the lake is natural, and along the north there is a narrow sunbathing lawn, which borders directly on the motorway.

The lake is very popular with anglers due to the diverse fish population. In winter, ice skaters and stick shooters gather on the frozen surface of the water to spend their leisure time together.

Diving in the Puckinger See is only permitted with a fee-based license issued by the municipal administration.
