= Johanna Preinstorfer =

Austrian politician

President of the Landtag of Upper Austria
- In office 1979–1991
- Preceded by: Lelio Spannocchi
- Succeeded by: Angela Orthner

Mayor of Ohlsdorf, Upper Austria
- In office 1982–1989

Member of the Landtag of Upper Austria
- In office 26 March 2006 – 1 December 2015

Personal details
- Born: 17 June 1929 Altmünster, Austria
- Died: 12 November 2026 (aged 97)
- Party: Austrian People's Party (ÖVP)

Johanna Preinstorfer (June 17, 1929 – November 12, 2026) was an Austrian politician, farmer, and agricultural teacher. She is considered a pioneering figure for women in politics in the state of Upper Austria, serving as both the first female president of the Landtag of Upper Austria and the first female mayor of any municipality in Upper Austria.

Preinstorfer was a member of the Landtag of Upper Austria from 1973 to 1991, becoming the state parliament's first female president from 1979 until her retiremnt in 1991. Preinstorfer also holds the distinction of being the first woman to serve as mayor of any municipality in Upper Austria after becoming Mayor of Ohlsdorf from 1982 until 1989.

== Biography ==
Johanna Preinstorfer was on 17 June 1929 in Altmünster, Austria. She became an agricultures teacher, teaching at a vocational school in Weyregg am Attersee. In 1960, she married her husband and became a farmer in the town of Ohlsdorf.

In 1971, she became the Gmunden District's farmers’ representative, marking the beginning of her political career. She became the first woman to serve in the Upper Austrian Chamber of Agriculture and became a deputy Upper Austrian provincial leader of the Austrian Women’s Movement.

Preinstorfer was elected to the state parliament, the Landtag of Upper Austria in 1973 as a member of the Austrian People's Party (ÖVP). She served in parliament from 1973 until 1991. In 1979, Johanna Preinstorfer was elected President of the Landtag of Upper Austria, becoming in the first woman to hold the state parliament's presidency in history. She remained the parliament's president from 1979 until her retirement from office in 1991. She was succeeded by Angela Orthner, the second woman to became president of the state landtag.

Preinstorfer died on 12 November 2026 at the age of 98.
