= Gerhard Egger (Mostrocker) =

Austrian songwriter, composer, author and Alpenrock pioneer

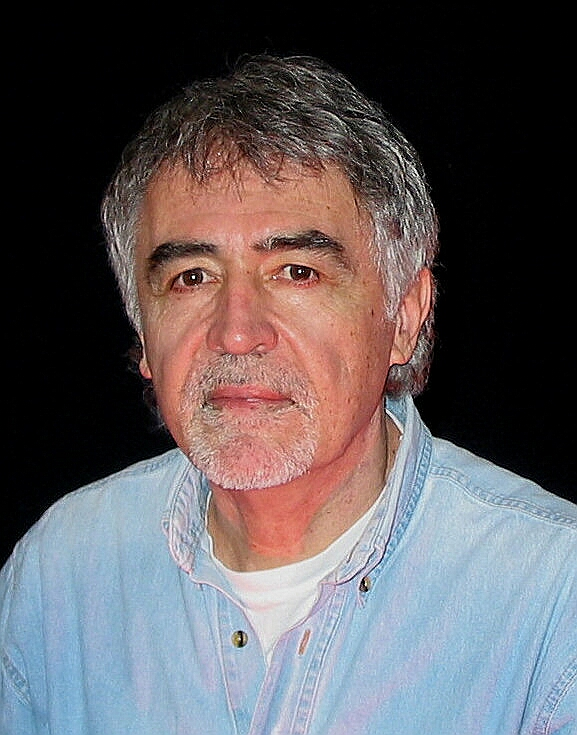
Gerhard Egger (Mostrocker), 2011

Gerhard Egger (born 14 October 1949 in Gosau, Upper Austria) is an Austrian songwriter, composer, author and Alpenrock pioneer. He is also known as the "Mostrocker".

== Life ==
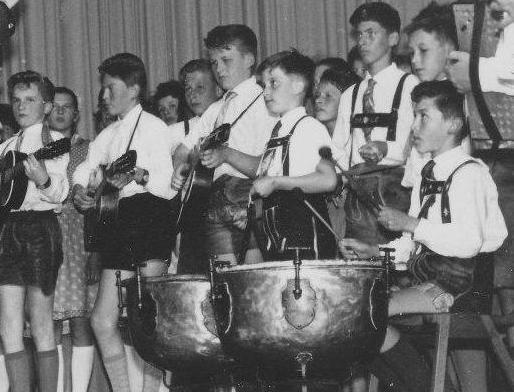
G. Egger (school band), Bad Goisern, 1962

=== Folk musician (since 1953) ===
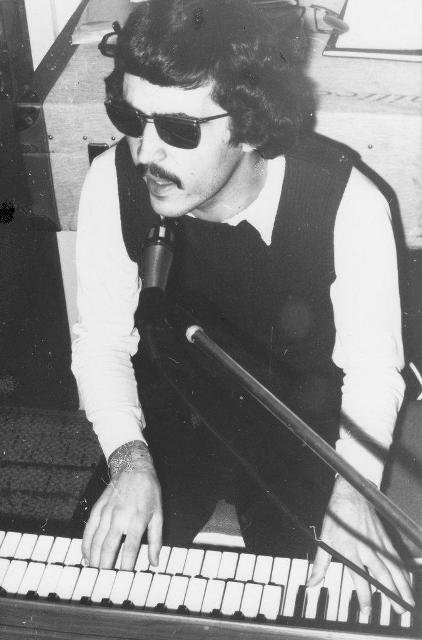
G. Egger (Art Boys Collection), Konzerthausstudio Vienna, 1970

Egger began attending primary school in Gosau from 1956 and moved to secondary school in Bad Goisern in 1960. There, he appeared for the first time in the school band with future rock singer-songwriter Wilfried Scheutz. In 1964, he left his village to attend a high school in Oberschützen, in southern Burgenland, Austria, which focused on music. Previously self-taught, he received piano and church organ lessons there for the first time. As a fan of The Beatles he taught himself to play the guitar and began writing his own songs in English.

=== Songwriter (since 1964) ===
1969 he moved to Linz, attended the teacher training college and won the Innviertel Grand Prix interpreter competition with his own songs. As singer, guitarist and songwriter of the group Art Boys Collection, he reached number 3 in the Discparade of the radio station Ö3 in 1971. (Due to a change in the counting system, the months May till December 1971 are missing in the statistics of the Austrian Charts).

Egger mixed different unusual styles in his songs for the ABC-Album Stoned Wall released in 1973. After a radio boycott this production was only moderately successful. Egger left the group, finished his studies, began teaching as a primary school teacher in Stadl-Paura and backpacked through Europe as a musician for two summers.

=== Pedagogue (since 1971) ===
In 1974, he married and worked as spokesman for an “Activity Group for Primary School Teachers”, that paved the way for the legal equality of primary and secondary school teachers. In 1975, he began writing songs in Austrian dialect and added elements of folk music. Without much expectation for success for this kind of Alpine music, he toured through Austria and Bavaria with the Coverband "Broadway" as a part-time keyboarder and singer.

=== Producer (since 1980) ===
Together with other musicians he founded the Ringstrasse recording studio in Wels in 1980. Later, composer Hanneliese Kreissl-Wurth joined them. Apart from producing he also wrote songs for Waterloo and Robinson and Wilfried Scheutz, some of which were produced.

=== Mostrocker (since 1985) ===
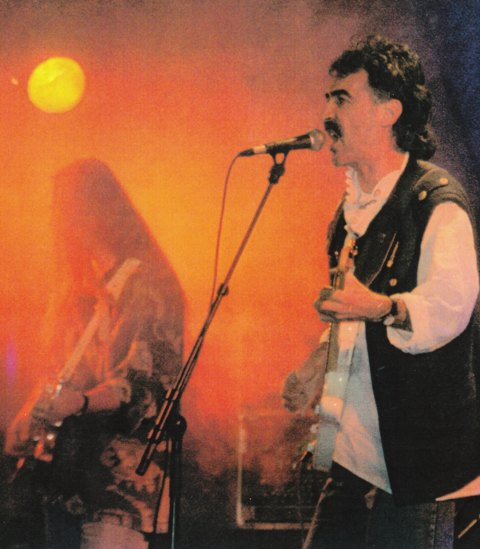
G. Egger (Mostrocker), Rockhouse Salzburg, 1996

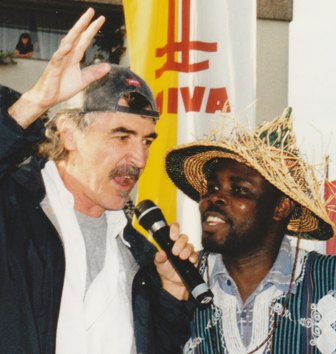
G. Egger (Weltband), Weltfest Stadl-Paura, 1999

Together with the guitarist Gery Moder, he launched the band Gerhard Egger & Die Mostrocker in 1985. They called their then barely-known mixture of rock and folk music "Mostrock". Their first album Vom Dachstoa bis nach Tennessee gained some attention in 1987, well before musicians like Attwenger and Hubert von Goisern stormed stages with a similar music style. His second album was the Alpenrock opera Hallstatt-Das Mystical, which was released 1991. Its debut performance was during the Hallstatt culture week "Kunst im Hochtal" in 1993. As a successful composer he became a voting member of the Austrian copyright society AKM in 1994. That year, he moved to Lambach. In 1995, Egger and Moder collaborated with studio musicians Willi Langer and Tommy Böröcz to produce the third album Hoamatblues. An Alpenrock tour with Ausseer Hardbradler followed.

In 1996, Egger composed the Alpenrock children's musical Der Flößerkater & Die Traungeister and performed it with 300 people in Stadl-Paura. Additionally he wrote an accompanying reading and songbook.

=== World-musician (since 1998) ===
In 1998, Egger wrote and produced the "Stadlinger Anthem", based on the motto “Think globally, act locally.” The result was an album in ten different versions with artists from the pop, rock, folk, choral and classical genres. In 1999, on the occasion of the Weltfest (world festival) of the MIVA he composed the "WeltSong" and performed it together with musicians from Africa, Latin America, Asia and Europe.

In 2000, he dedicated the "Christoph Sieber Surfing Song" to Olympic surfing champion Christoph Sieber and premiered it at his Olympic Gala. In 2002, he was approached by the newspaper Oberösterreichische Nachrichten to set the dialect text of the Franz Stelzhamer-lyrical contest "Segn und Sagn" to music. The result was a CD which was presented at a gala evening at the Landestheater Linz.

2003 Egger released the album "SchonZeit" with his musical versions of the Stelzhamer poems. After that he went on tour through Austria with his Mostrockern and his new drummer Stefan Hofer.

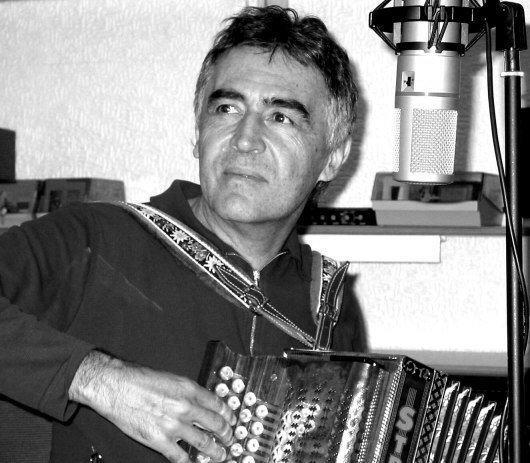
G. Egger, Riff-Studio Lambach, 2004

=== Headmaster (since 2003) ===
In 2003, Egger became headmaster of the primary school in Stadl-Paura. For the following six years he dedicated his time and energy to school development. In 2009, he retired and was awarded the Stadl-Paura Community Ring of Honor for his public service.

=== Author (since 2009) ===
In 2010, Egger (Mostrocker), in posthumous collaboration with his grandfather, went on a search for historical clues and published the book "Zeitspuren aus dem inneren Salzkammergut" (Traces of Time from the Inner Salzkammergut) as a result. The book was presented at the Frankfurt book fair.

The next year, a 40-year-old album Egger recorded with his first band was re-released. It reached number one in the Nitro-Download-Charts and received positive reviews

=== Late works (since 2012) ===
In 2012, Egger released his album "Gerhard Eggers Lonely Mostrock Band“ with 12 self-written songs in the Beatles-Style. 6 of them have been played more than 5000 times on Austrian Radio Stations. In 2019, he came back to the public with his album "Regenbogenland“, the first part of a rock opera soundtrack, by returning to the spirit of Woodstock and the peace movement of 1969. In 2023, he finished the second part of the rock opera soundtrack, returning to the spirit of the alpine rock of the 1990s. In 2025 he released his angloamerican Poprock-Album "First Songs", written by himself in the 1960s.

== Discography ==
=== Albums ===
- 1972: Stoned Wall – Art Boys Collection with Gerhard Egger, Album, Lesborne
- 1987: Vom Dachstoa bis nach Tennessee – Gerhard Egger & Die Mostrocker, Album, Riff Records
- 1991: Hallstatt–Das Mystical – Gerhard Egger & Die Mostrocker, Album, Riff Records
- 1995: Hoamatblues Gerhard Egger & Die Mostrocker, Album, Koch Int.
- 1996: Der Flößerkater & DieTraungeister – Gerhard Egger, Album, Riff Records
- 1997: Grenzgänger – Egger, Album, Koch Int.
- 2000: Stadlinger Hymne – Gerhard Egger & friends, Album, Riff Records
- 2001: Stoned Wall – Art Boys Collection with Gerhard Egger, Album, Garden of Delights
- 2004: SchonZeit – Gerhard Egger & Die Mostrocker, Album, Musica
- 2011: Stoned Wall – Art Boys Collection with Gerhard Egger, Release-Vinyl-Album, Golden Pavilion
- 2012: Gerhard Eggers Lonely Mostrock Band – Gerhard Egger & Die Mostrocker, Album, Birne Records
- 2019: Regenbogenland – Gerhard Egger & Die Mostrocker, Album, Birne Records
- 2023: Freiflug - Gerhard Egger & Die Mostrocker, Album, Birne Records
- 2025: First Songs - Gerhard Egger, Vinyl-Album, Birne Records

=== Singles ===
- 1970: Lemon Tree – Art Boys Collection with Gerhard Egger, Single, Lesborne
- 1971: Jesus Said – Art Boys Collection with Gerhard Egger, Single, Lesborne
- 1971: Life Is A Dream – Art Boys Collection with Gerhard Egger, Single, Interpop
- 1971: Freedom Voice of My Soul – Art Boys Collection with Gerhard Egger, Single,

      Lesborne

- 1987: Der Summa is im kumma – Gerhard Egger & Die Mostrocker, Single, Ringstrasse
- 1995: Scheni Leni – Gerhard Egger & Die Mostrocker, Single-Koch Int.
- 1995: Übern See – Gerhard Egger & Die Mostrocker, Single, Koch Int.
- 1996: Touristen – Gerhard Egger & Die Mostrocker, Single, Koch Int.
- 1997: Gemma's an – Egger, Single, Koch Int.
- 1999: WeltSong – Gerhard Egger & Die WeltBand, Single, Riff Records
- 2003: Schonzeit – Gerhard Egger & Die Mostrocker, Single, Musica
- 2012: Mondsuechtig – Gerhard Egger & Mostrocker, Single, Birne Records
- 2013: Tanz mit mir Marie – Gerhard Egger & Die Mostrocker, Single, Birne Records
- 2018: Himmi voller Stern – Gerhard Egger & Die Mostrocker, Single, Birne Records
- 2018: Dezemberschnee – Gerhard Egger & Die Mostrocker, Single, Birne Records
- 2019: Regenbogenland - Gerhard Egger & Die Mostrocker, Single, Birne Records
- 2020: Du ghörst zu mir - Gerhard Egger & Die Mostrocker, Single, Birne Records
- 2021: Herbstzeitlos - Gerhard Egger & Die Mostrocker, Single, Birne Records
- 2022: Wilfriedlied - Gerhard Egger & Die Mostrocker, Single, Birne Records
- 2023: Mehr mehr mehr - Gerhard Egger & Die Mostrocker, Single, Birne Records
- 2024: Marilyn Monroe/Insel der Seligen - Gerhard Egger & Die Mostrocker, Single,

      Birne Records

- 2025: Julia - Gerhard Egger, Single, Birne Records

=== Compilations ===
- 1970: Pop Made in Austria 1 – Lesborne
- 1971: Pop Made in Austria 3 – Lesborne
- 1974: Zwickt's mi – Lesborne
- 1995: Alpen-Rock 3 – Koch Int.
- 1996: Gipfelstürmer 2 – MCA
- 1996: Alpen-Rock 96 – Koch Int.
- 1997: Ottis Schlachtplatte – Koch Int.
- 1997: Best of Alpenrock–Hits der 80er u. 90er – BGM Ariola
- 1998: Almenrock – Koch Int.
- 1998: Alpen-Rock – Koch Int.
- 1999: Alpen-Rock im Doppelpack II – Koch Int.
- 1999: Alpenrock presented by M&M – BGM Ariola
- 1999: Bayern Power – Zyx Music
- 1999: Der Berg ruft – Junge Klänge – Verlag Das Beste
- 2000: Alpen-Rock im Doppelpack III – Koch Int.
- 2001: Power der Berge – Koch Universal
- 2001: Psychedelic Underground – Garden of Delights
- 2002: Segn und Sagn – Riff Records
- 2004: Alpenrock Hüttenkracher – Koch Universal

== Books ==
- 1996: Der Flößerkater und die Traungeister – Lese- und Liederbuch – Gerhard Egger – Riff-Productions Lambach
- 2001: Rüdiger, der Feuerdrache – Kinderbuch – Gerhard Egger/Ruth Zizlavsky – Verlag HKM Lambach
- 2009: Mundart 2009 – Lyrikanthologie des Stelzhamerbundes – Gerhard Egger/Diverse – Verlag Plöchl Freistadt
- 2010: Zeitspuren aus dem inneren Salzkammergut – Gerhard Egger/Josef Posch – Edition Innsalz
- 2021: Das Glaeserne Tal - Historischer Roman - Gerhard Egger - Verlag Nina Roitner

== Awards ==
- 1970: Winning singer of the "Innviertel-Grand-Prix"
- 1993: Förderpreis der AUME für die Alpinrock-Oper "Hallstatt-Das Mystical"
- 2000: Kulturplakette der Gemeinde Stadl-Paura
- 2009: Verleihung des Ehrenringes der Gemeinde Stadl-Paura

== Literature ==
- Gerhard Egger/Josef Posch: Zeitspuren aus dem inneren Salzkammergut. Edition Innsalz, Ranshofen/Osternberg 2010. Deutsche Nationalbibliothek (ISBN 978-3-902616-35-7)
- Anthologie: Mundart 2009. Verlag Plöchl, Freistadt 2009 (ISBN 978-3-901479-46-5)
- Das Glaeserne Tal - Historischer Roman - Gerhard Egger - Verlag Nina Roitner, Austria (ISBN 978-3-903250-53-6)
