= Große Bischofsmütze =

Mountain in Salzburg state, Austria

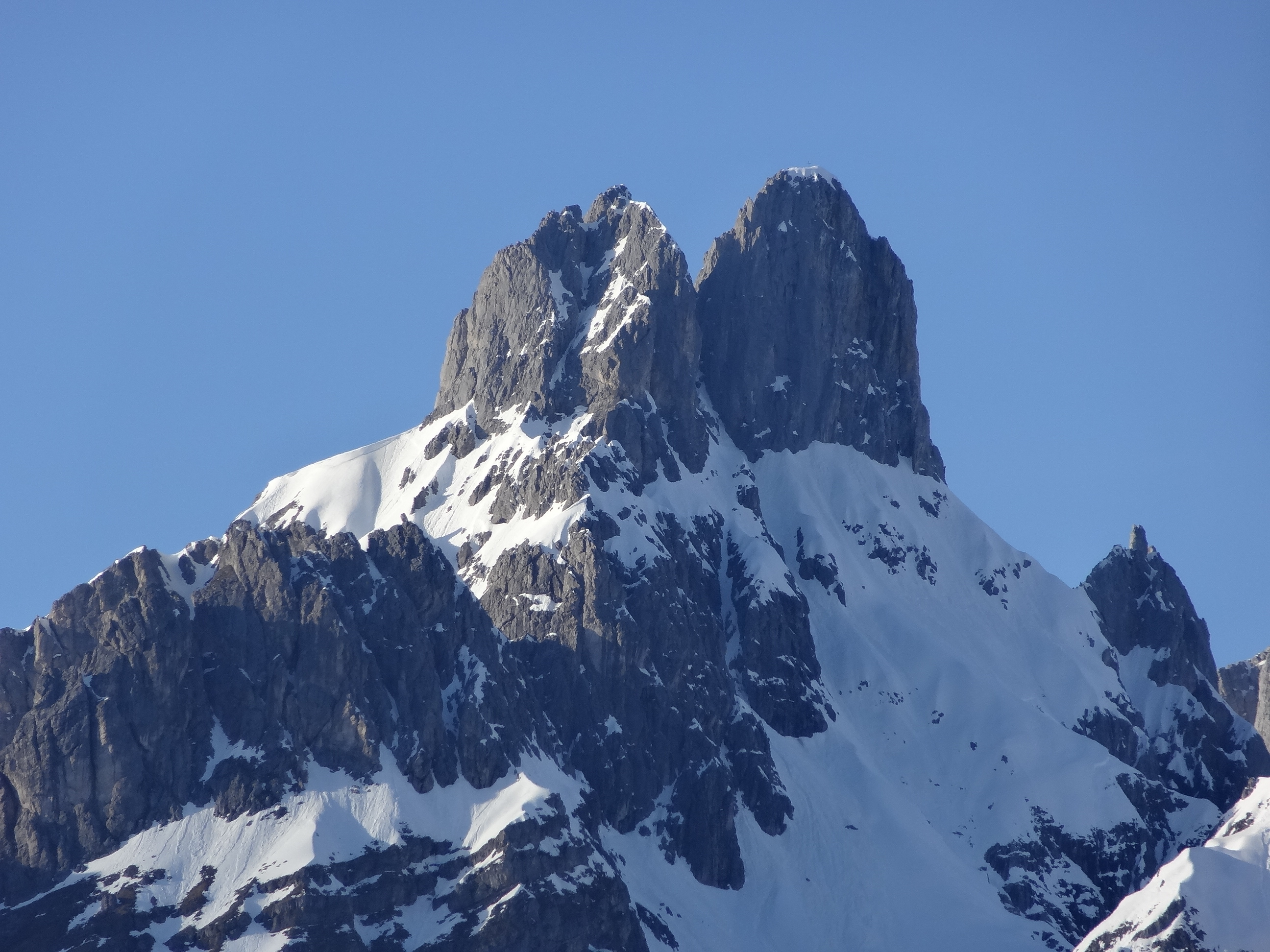
- View from southeast, the Große Bischofsmütze is the right peak, with the Kleine Bischofsmütze on the left

Highest point
- Elevation: 2,458 m (8,064 ft)
- Prominence: 612 m (2,008 ft)
- Coordinates: 47°29′37″N 13°30′42″E

Naming
- English translation: great bishop's mitre, great bishop's hat
- Language of name: German

Geography
- Location within Austria
- Location: Salzburg, Austria
- Parent range: Northern Limestone Alps

Climbing
- First ascent: June 28, 1879 by Johann Anhäusler and Johann Steiner

The Große Bischofsmütze (German: "great bishop's mitre") is the highest peak in the Gosaukamm range of the Dachstein Mountains, Austria.

Together with the Kleine Bischofsmütze (2,430 metres [7,970 ft]), the Große Bischofsmütze (2,458 metres [8,064 ft]) forms a distinctive twin-peak, with the two summits separated by the Mützenschlucht ravine. The mountain is in the state of Salzburg, near the border with Upper Austria, and forms part of the larger Northern Limestone Alps.

== History ==
The name of the mountain can be attributed to its characteristic shape, that resembles a bishop's mitre ("Bischofsmütze"). The mountain has also been referred to historically as Gosauer Stein ("Stone of Gosau") due to its location overlooking the town of Gosau.

The Große Bischofsmütze was first ascended on June 28, 1879 by Johann Anhäusler and Johann Steiner.

Two major rockfalls occurred in 1993 that displaced 100,000 tonnes (98,000 long tons; 110,000 short tons) of rock into the valley below, altering the mountain's visual profile.

== Geology ==
The upper parts of the mountain are composed of Dachstein limestone whilst the base is composed of dolomite. The rocks date from the Upper Triassic period.

== Climbing ==
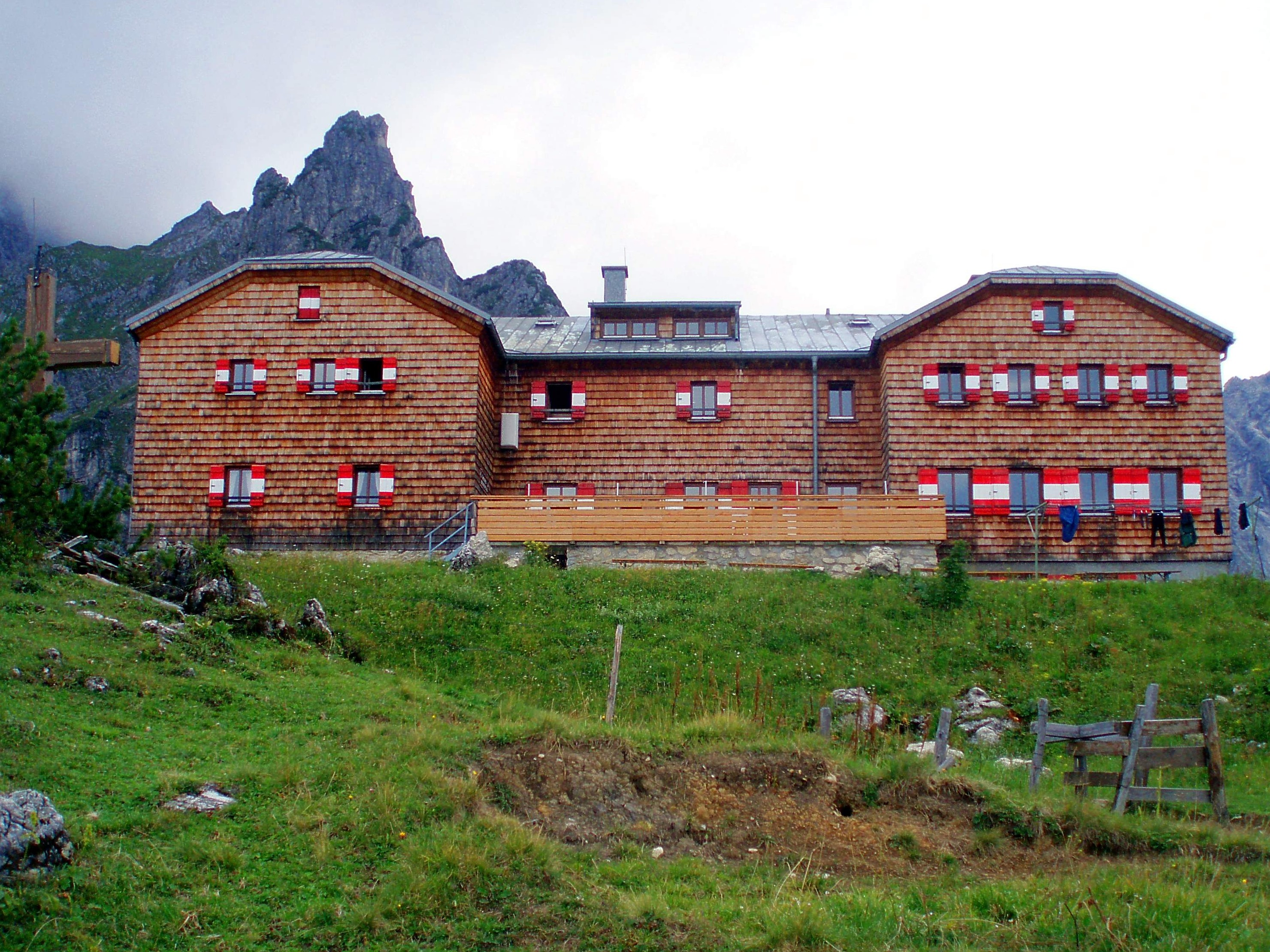
Photograph of the Hofpürglhütte showing the Große Bischofsmütze in the background

The summit of the Große Bischofsmütze can only be accessed through rock climbing. The "Normal route" has an approach from the south passing through the Mützenschlucht, and on the UIAA climbing scale is graded III. The route is polished, and also commonly used for descent. Some abseil points are present. The Alpine club hut Hofpürglhütte that is directly south of the mountain is a base for many ascents. With a history of rockfalls and a particular fragile eastern side, the mountain is currently monitored to identify changes to its internal structure and assess risk of rock collapse.

== Gallery ==
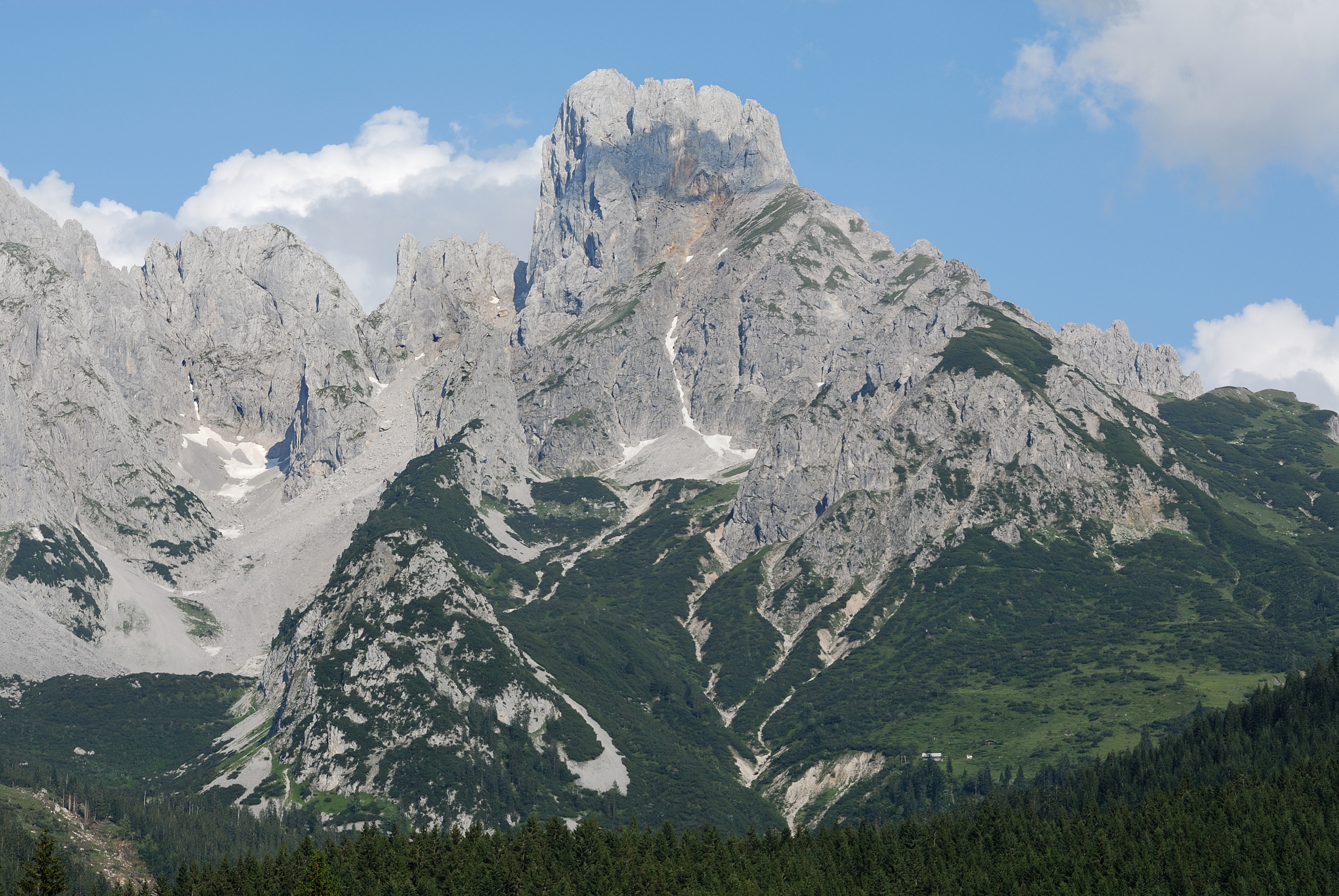
View from the west

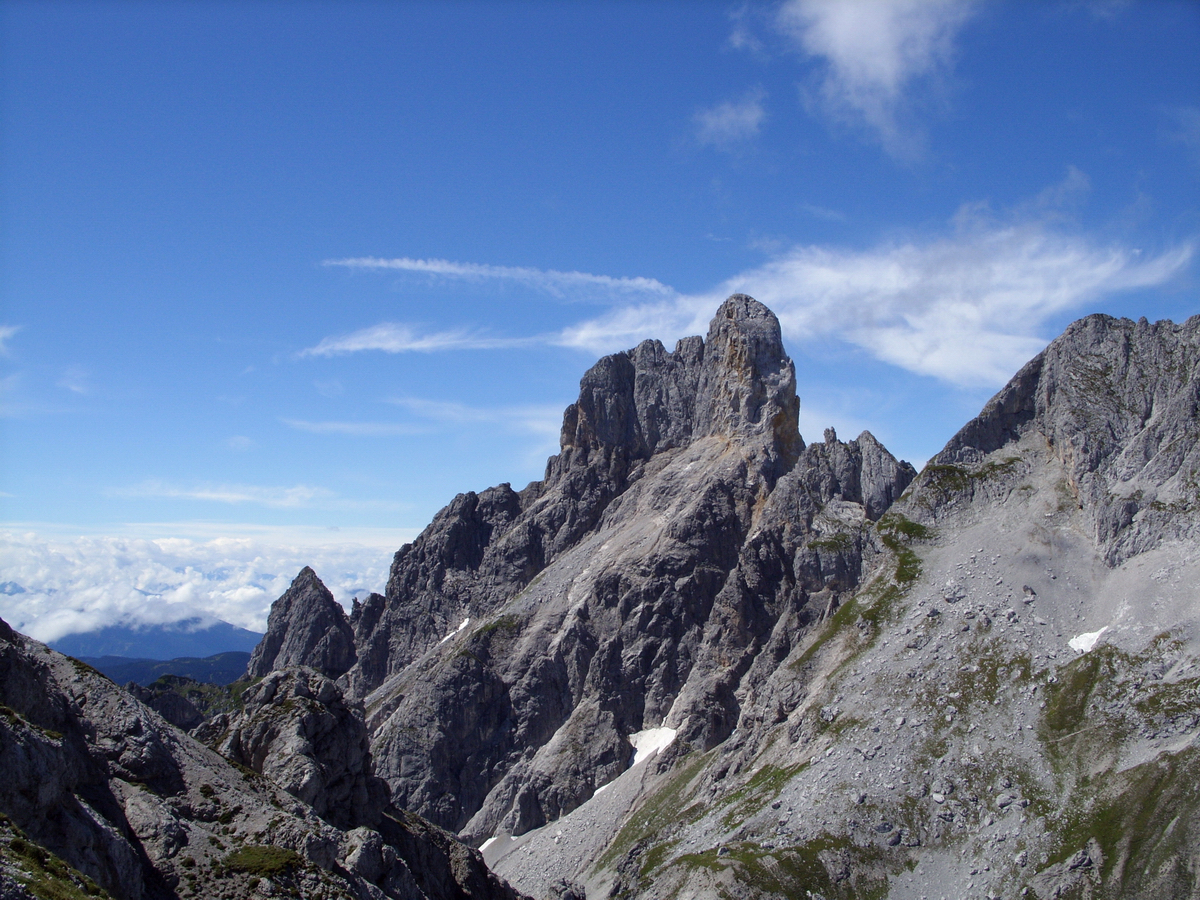
View from the east

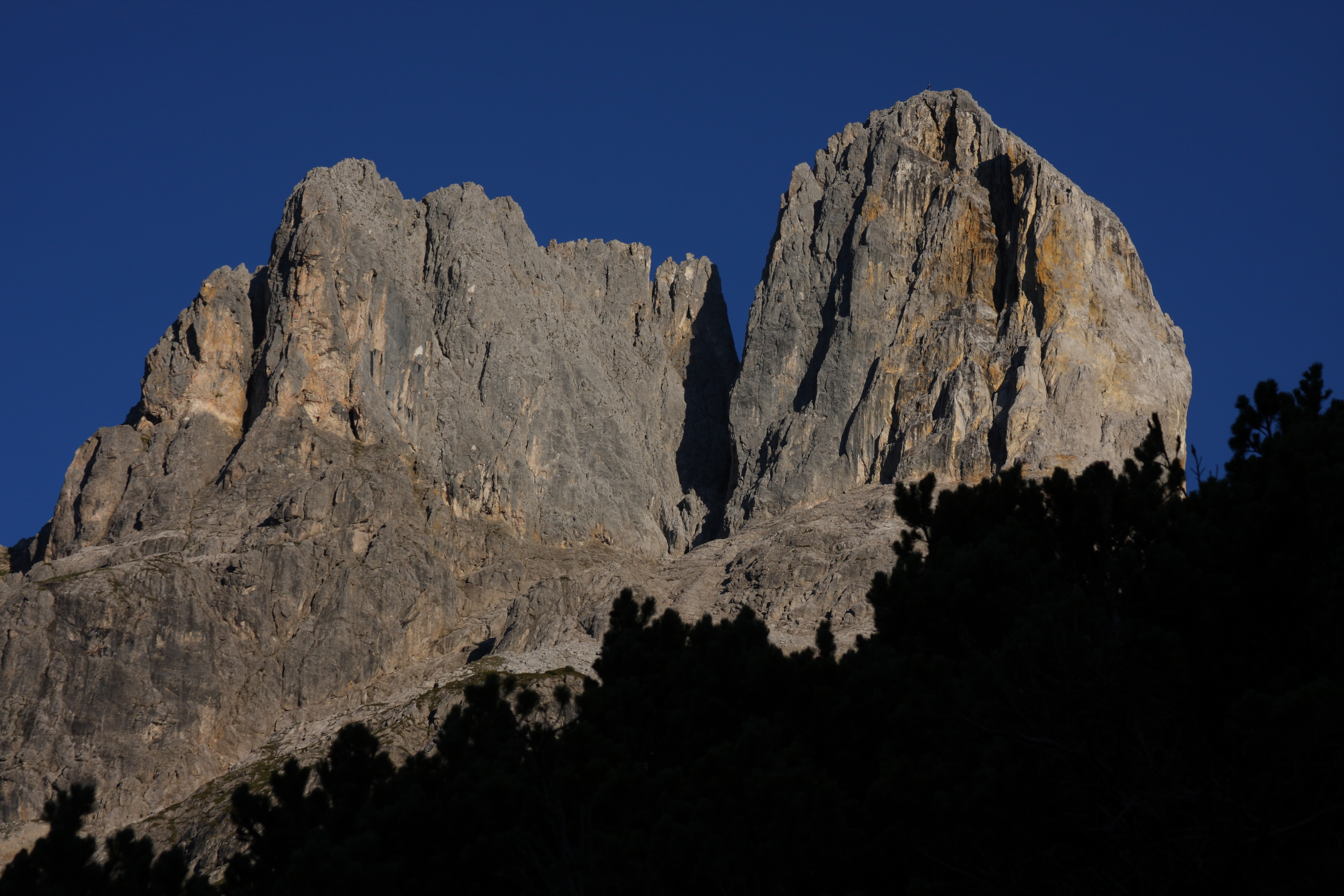
More detailed view from the south

== See also ==
- Double summit
- Gosaukamm
