= Nussensee =

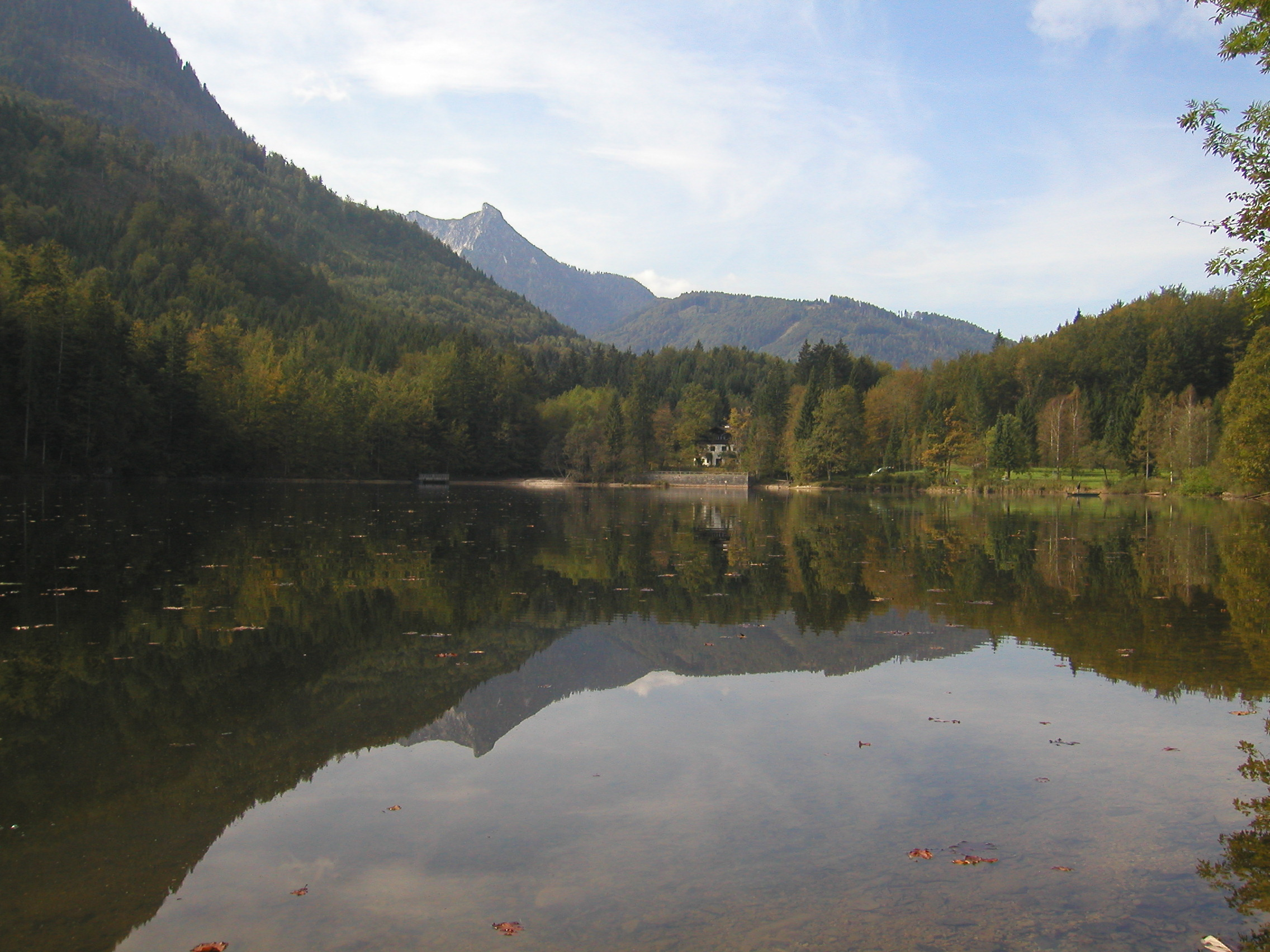

- Location within Austria
- Location: Upper Austria, Austria
- Coordinates: 47°42′15″N 13°34′18″E
- Type: lake
- Max. length: 600 m (2,000 ft)
- Max. width: 250 m (820 ft)
- Surface area: 10 hectares (25 acres)
- Max. depth: 14.7 m (48 ft)

Nussensee is a lake in Upper Austria. It is located at Bad Ischl in the Salzkammergut. It has an area of approximately 10 hectares (25 acres) and a maximum depth of 14.7 m (48 ft). The Nussensee is about 600 m (2,000 ft) long and up to 250 m (820 ft) wide. It is fed almost entirely by underground springs and is subject to fluctuations in level of several metres. This helps support rare plants such as the common water chestnut (Trapa natans) grow near the lake.
