= Ausee =

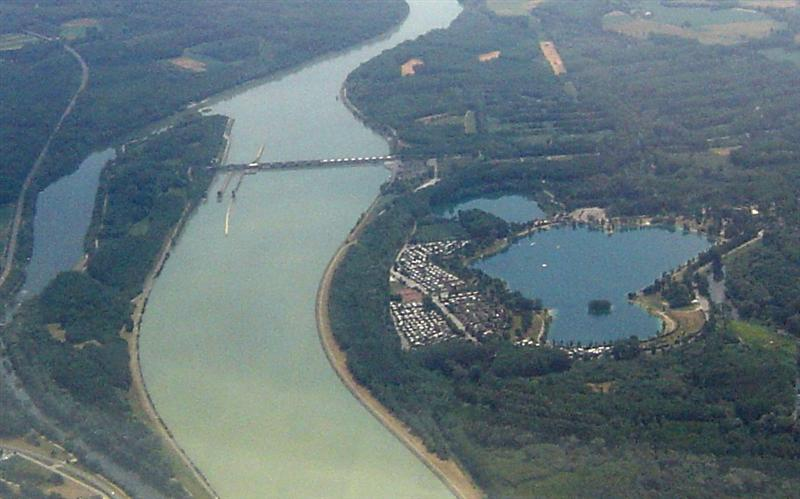

- Location within Austria
- Location: Campingdorf Hohenlohe, Upper Austria
- Coordinates: 48.2484°N 14.4166°E
- Type: natural freshwater lake
- Basin countries: Austria
- Max. length: 1,335 feet (407 m)
- Max. width: 650 feet (200 m)
- Surface area: 23 acres (9.3 ha)
- Max. depth: 10 metres (33 ft)
- Islands: 1
- Settlements: Campingdorf Hohenlohe

Ausee is a lake of Upper Austria. It spans 23 acres and is up to 10 m deep. It is privately owned.
