= Rosenhofer Teiche =

- Location within Austria
- Location: Upper Austria, Austria
- Coordinates: 48°33′57″N 14°40′35″E
- Type: lake

Rosenhofer Teiche is a lake of Upper Austria.
