= Landtag of Upper Austria =

Parliament of the state of Upper Austria

Landtag of Upper Austria Oberösterreichischer Landtag

Type
- Type: Landtag

History
- Founded: 1861; 1920

Leadership
- President of the Landtag: Max Hiegelsberger, ÖVP

Structure
- Seats: 56
- Political groups: Government (33): ÖVP (22); FPÖ (11); Opposition (23): SPÖ (11); GRÜNE (7); MFG (3); NEOS (2)
- Length of term: 6 years

Elections
- Last election: 26 September 2021
- Next election: 2027

Meeting place
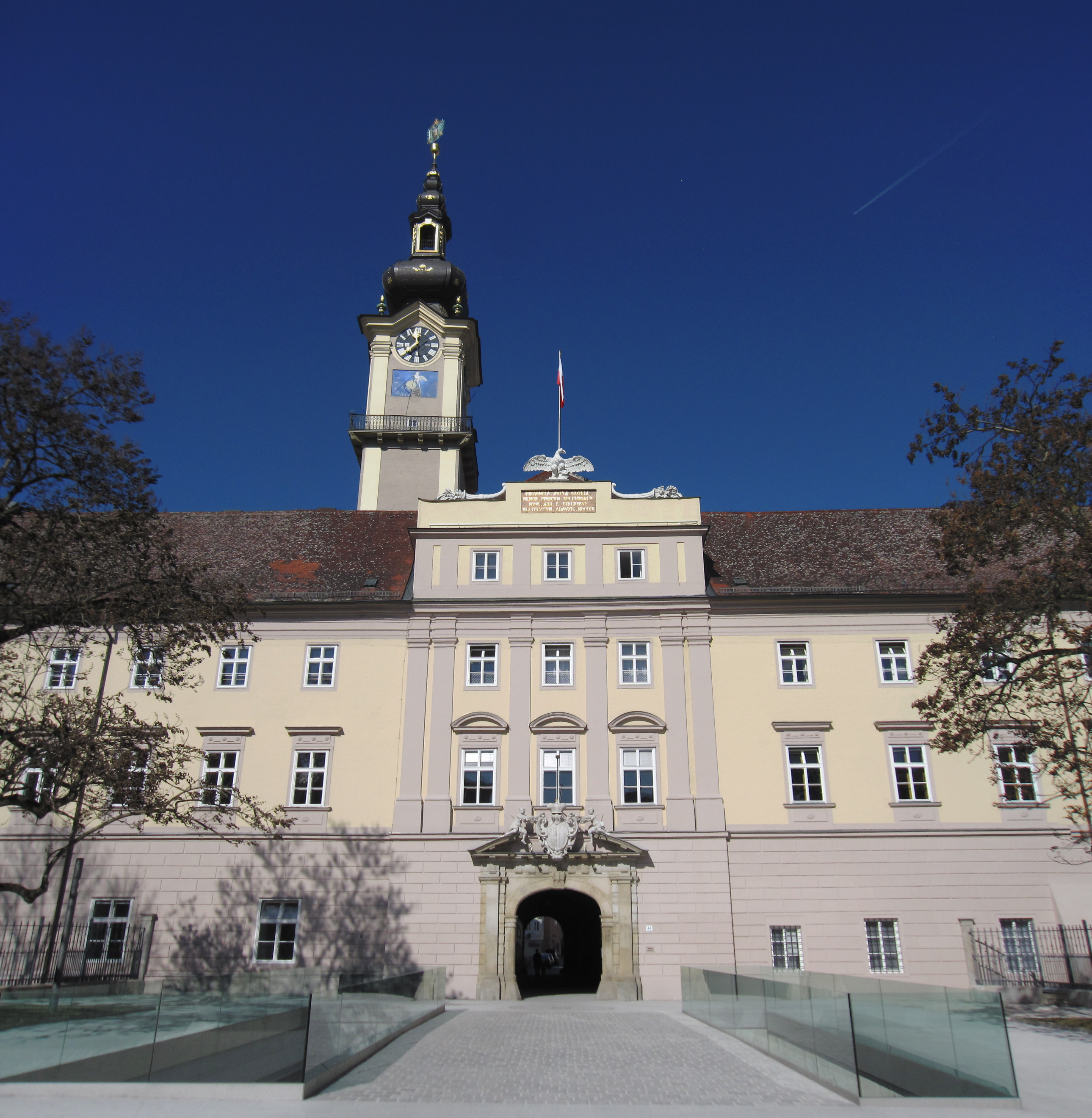
- Linz, Upper Austria

Website
- ooe-landtag.at

The Landtag of Upper Austria (German: Oberösterreichischer Landtag) is the unicameral parliament of Upper Austria, established in 1920. The most recent election was the 2021 Upper Austrian state election.

== History ==
Johanna Preinstorfer was the first woman elected President of the Landtag of Upper Austria in history, serving in that position from 1979 until her retirement in 1991.
