= Höllerersee =

Lake in Austria

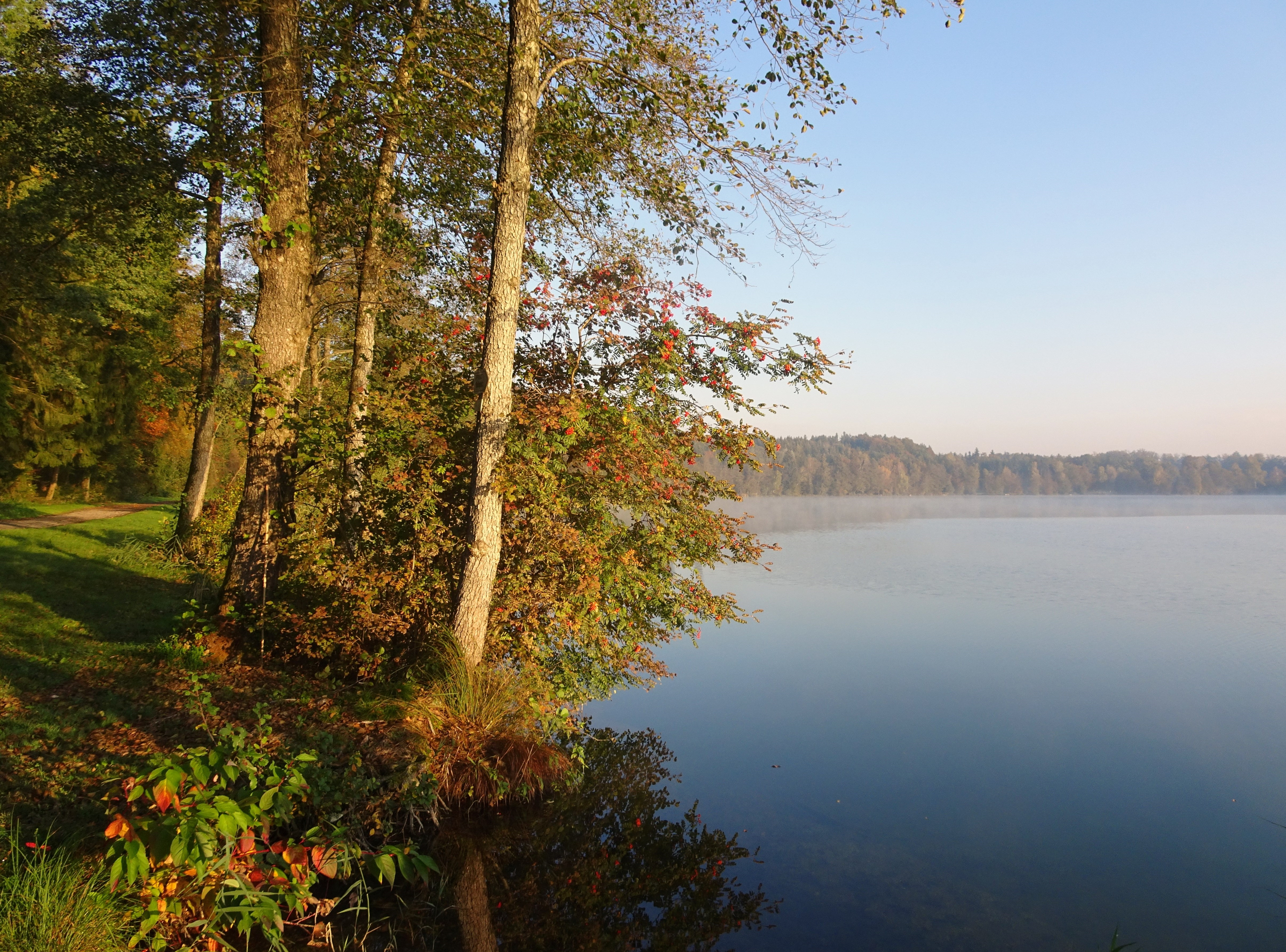
- Höllerersee in October

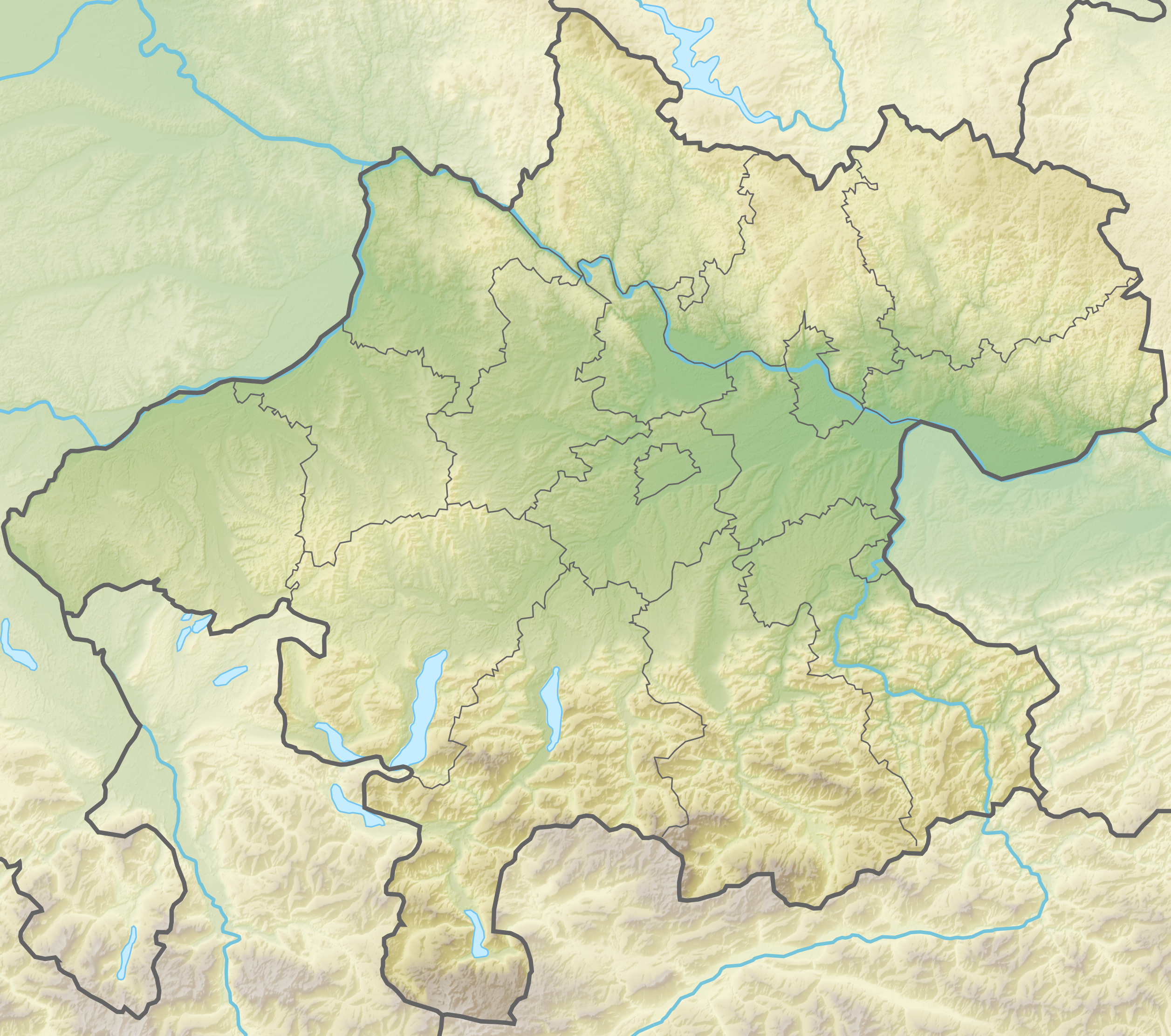
- Location within Upper Austria
- Location: Upper Austria
- Coordinates: 48°01′35″N 12°53′24″E

Höllerersee is a lake of Upper Austria. It is about 0.2 square kilometers in size and about 21 meters deep. It is located in Braunau, though sits close to the provincial border of Salzburg.
