= Ohlsdorf =

Ohlsdorf may refer to:

- Ohlsdorf, Hamburg
  - Ohlsdorf Cemetery
- Ohlsdorf, Austria

== See also ==
- Olsdorf
