= Ohlsdorf, Austria =

Ohlsdorf
- Municipality
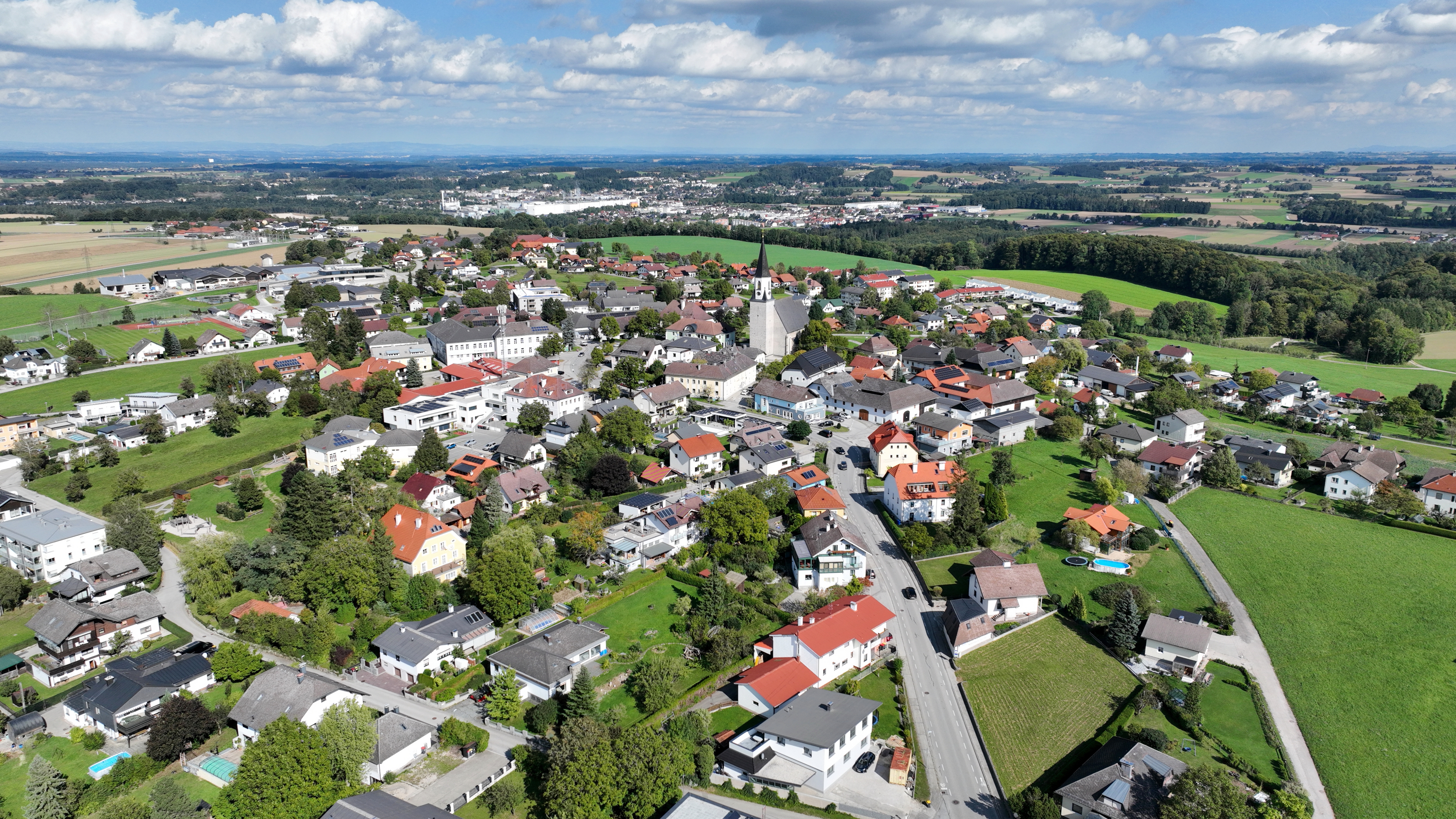
- Southwest view of Ohlsdorf

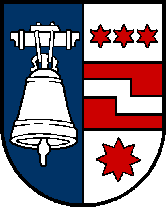
- Coat of arms

- Location within Austria
- Coordinates: 47°57′41″N 13°47′34″E
- Country: Austria
- State: Upper Austria
- District: Gmunden

Government
  - Mayor: Christine Eisner (ÖVP)

Area
  - Total: 27.83 km^{2} (10.75 sq mi)
- Elevation: 538 m (1,765 ft)

Population (2018-01-01)
  - Total: 5,209
  - Density: 187.2/km^{2} (484.8/sq mi)
- Time zone: UTC+1 (CET)
  - Summer (DST): UTC+2 (CEST)
- Postal code: 4694
- Area code: 07612
- Vehicle registration: GM
- Website: www.ohlsdorf.at

Ohlsdorf (Austrian German pronunciation: [ˈoːlsˌdɔrf]) is a municipality in the district of Gmunden in the Austrian state of Upper Austria.

== History ==
Johanna Preinstorfer, who served as the Mayor of Ohlsdorf from 1982 until 1989, was the first woman to become mayor of any municipality in Upper Austria in history.

== Population ==
Historical population
Year	Pop.	±%
1869	1,887	—
1880	2,008	+6.4%
1890	2,082	+3.7%
1900	2,188	+5.1%
1910	2,380	+8.8%
1923	2,230	−6.3%
1934	2,267	+1.7%
1939	2,443	+7.8%
1951	2,602	+6.5%
1961	2,526	−2.9%
1971	3,057	+21.0%
1981	3,768	+23.3%
1991	4,179	+10.9%
2001	4,528	+8.4%
