= Pichlinger See =

- Location within Austria
- Location: Upper Austria, Austria
- Coordinates: 48°14′24″N 14°22′53″E
- Type: Lake

Pichlinger See is a lake of Upper Austria.
