= Gosau =

- Municipality
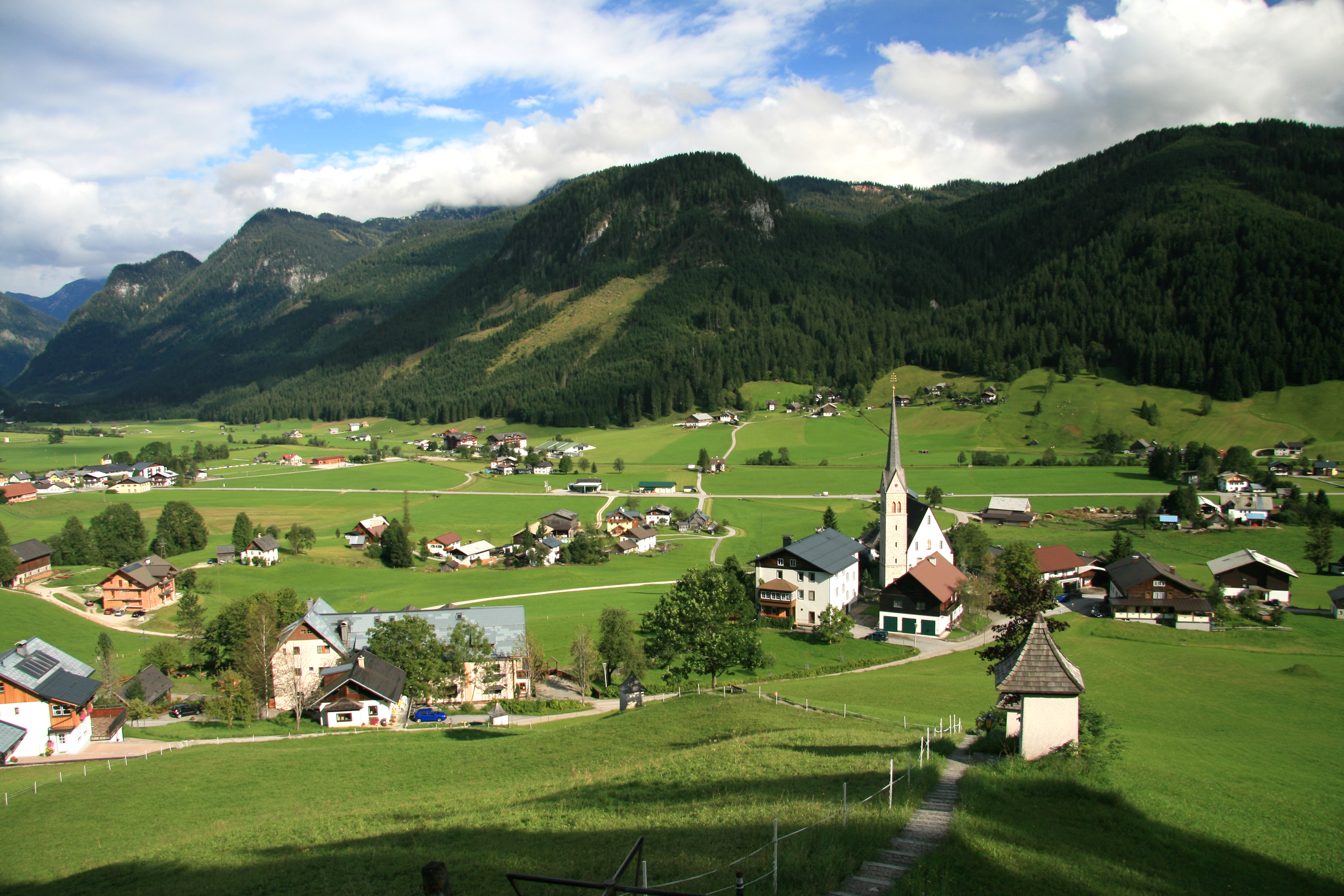

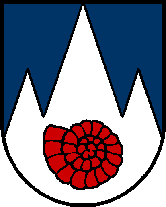
- Coat of arms

- Location within Austria
- Coordinates: 47°35′0″N 13°32′0″E
- Country: Austria
- State: Upper Austria
- District: Gmunden

Government
  - Mayor: Markus Schmaranzer (ÖVP)

Area
  - Total: 113.41 km^{2} (43.79 sq mi)
- Elevation: 767 m (2,516 ft)

Population (2018-01-01)
  - Total: 1,792
  - Density: 15.80/km^{2} (40.92/sq mi)
- Time zone: UTC+1 (CET)
  - Summer (DST): UTC+2 (CEST)
- Postal code: 4824
- Area code: 06136
- Vehicle registration: GM
- Website: www.gosau.ooe.gv.at

Gosau is a municipality in the district of Gmunden in Upper Austria, Austria.

== Location ==
Gosau is situated along the Gosaubach stream in the Salzkammergut region. The center of the town is at an elevation of 767 metres (2,516 ft). 58.9% of the municipality is forested. At the southern end of Gosau there is a road leading to Vorderer Gosausee, a lake with a view of the Dachstein.

Gosau is one of the few Lutheran communities in Austria, with about 71% of the population being Lutheran.

== History ==
The valley around Gosau was settled in the 13th century by monks from St. Peter's Abbey in Salzburg. Timber production for the salt mine in Hallstatt was a major industry. In 1490 the town became part of the Principality above the Enns River. The area was repeatedly occupied by the French during the Napoleonic Wars. When the Republic of Austria was formed in 1918, Gosau became part of the federal state of Upper Austria. In 1938 the area was annexed by the German Reich along with the rest of Austria, and Gosau became part of the "Gau Oberdonau," returning to Upper Austria when the Republic of Austria was reconstituted in 1945.

== Economy ==
In the past timber production and salt mining in neighboring Hallstatt were the major industries in Gosau. Today, tourism is the main source of income, although raising livestock, mainly cattle, is also an important economic activity.

== Politics ==
Gosau is governed by a 19-member council and Mayor Markus Schmaranzer of the Austrian People's Party.

== Notable people ==
- Gerhard Egger Mostrocker (born 1949), songwriter, composer, author and Alpenrockpioneer
