= Gosauseen =

Gosauseen are three lakes in the south-western, Alpine part of Upper Austria. They are situated near the town of Gosau, which is close to Salzburg. The mountains that encircle the lakes are called the Dachstein Mountains, whose glaciers partially shaped the landforms and still influence the hydrology of the area.

== Vorderer Gosausee ==
Vorderer Gosausee
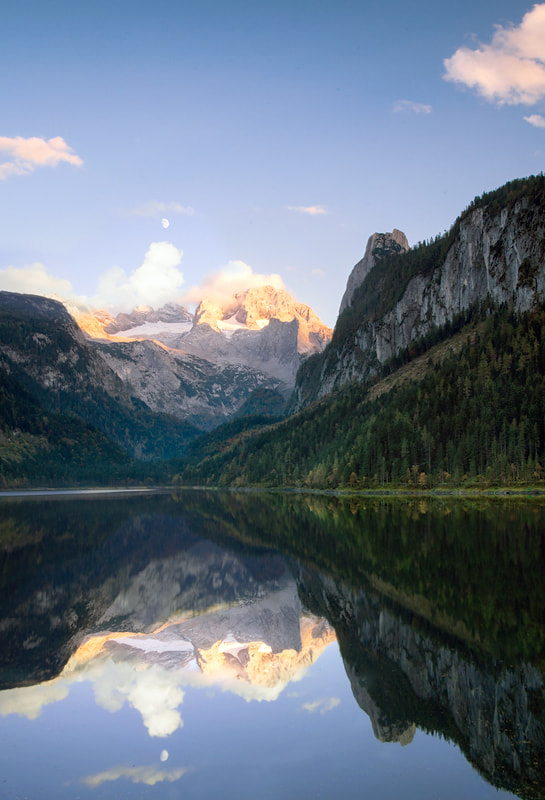
- Vorderer Gosausee at sunset

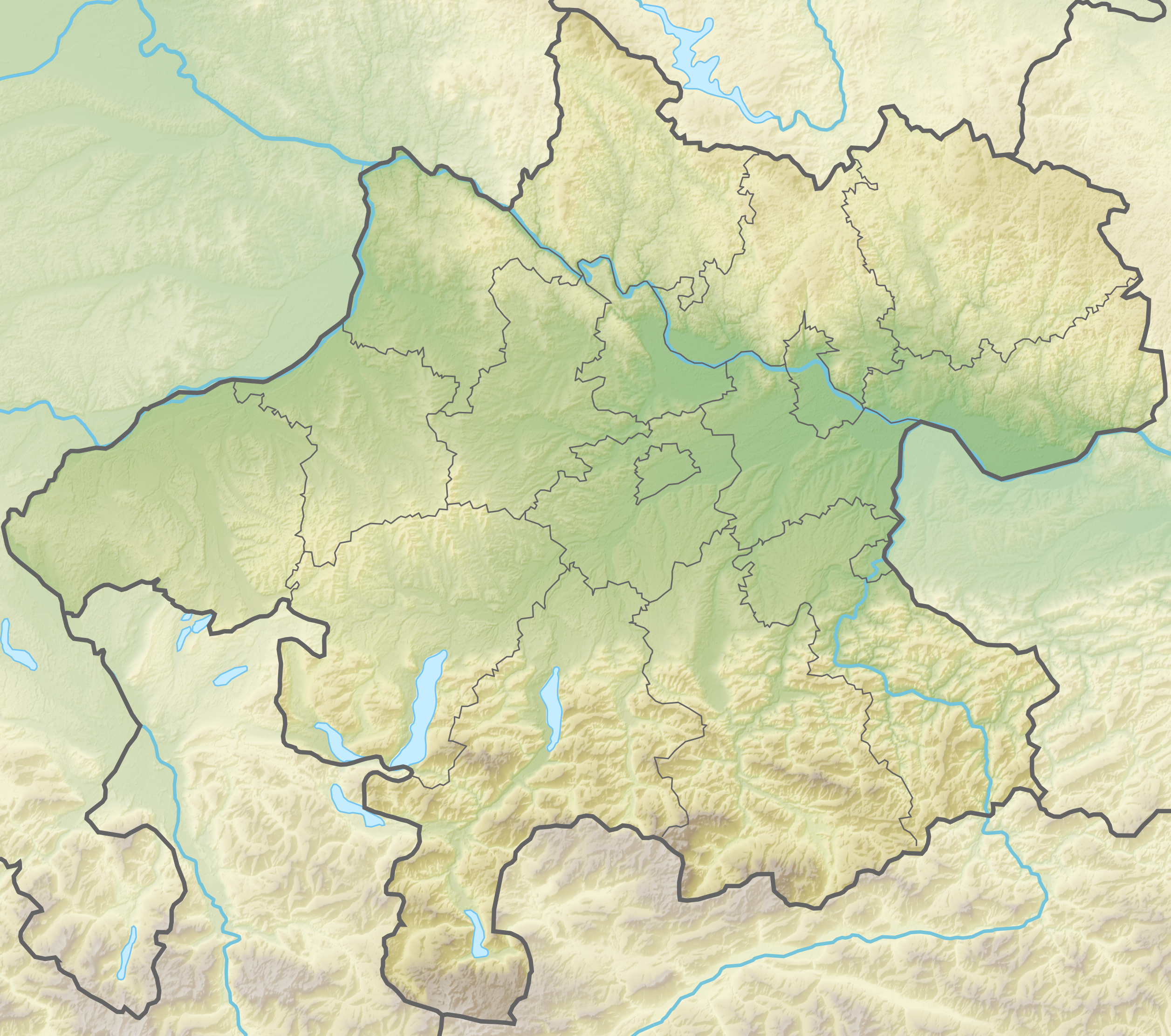
- Location within Upper Austria Location within Austria
- Group: Gosauseen
- Coordinates: 47°31′43.45″N 13°30′22.74″E
- Type: lake

This is the biggest of the three lakes. It has an aerial tramway at its more accessible end.

== Gosaulacke ==
Gosaulacke
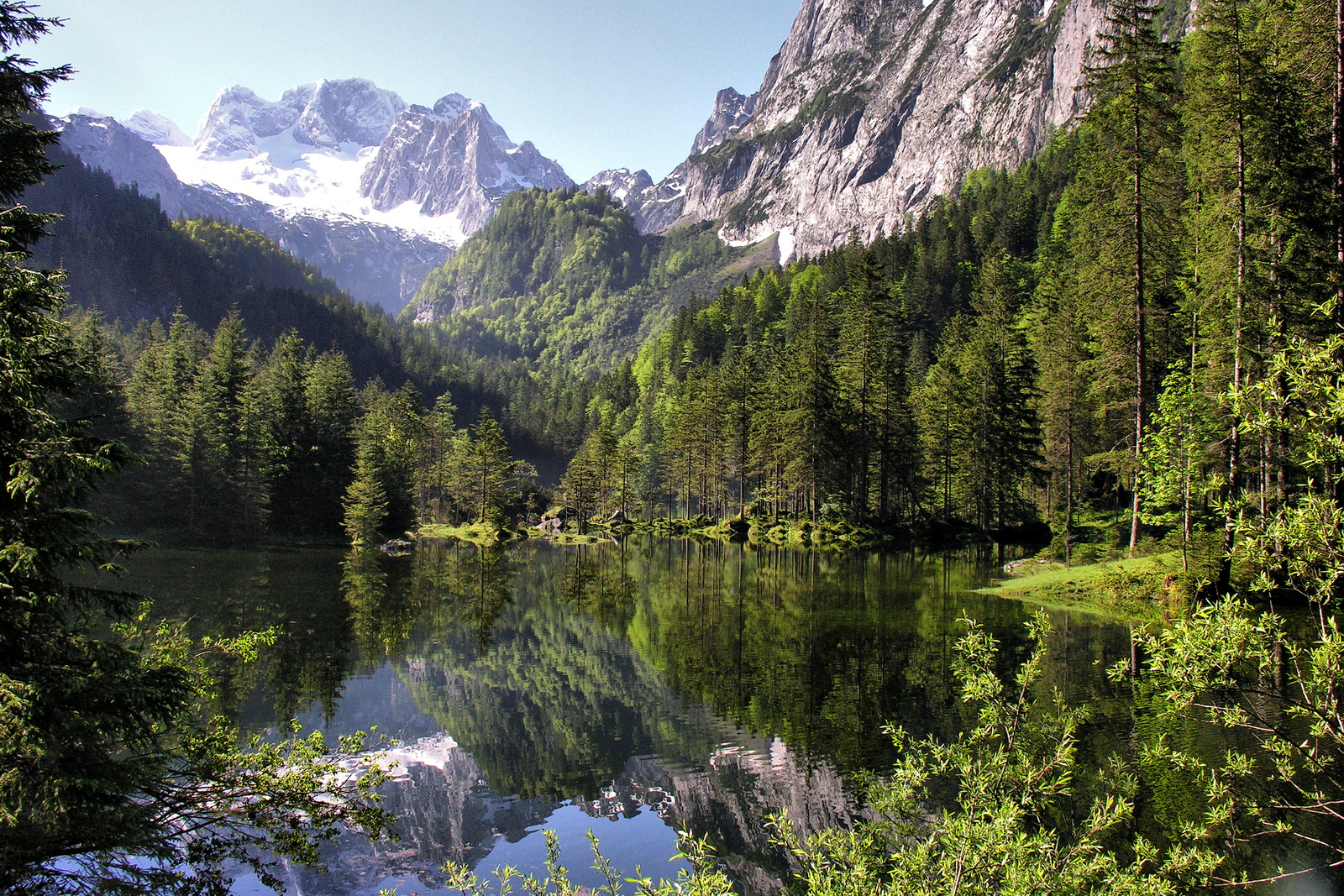

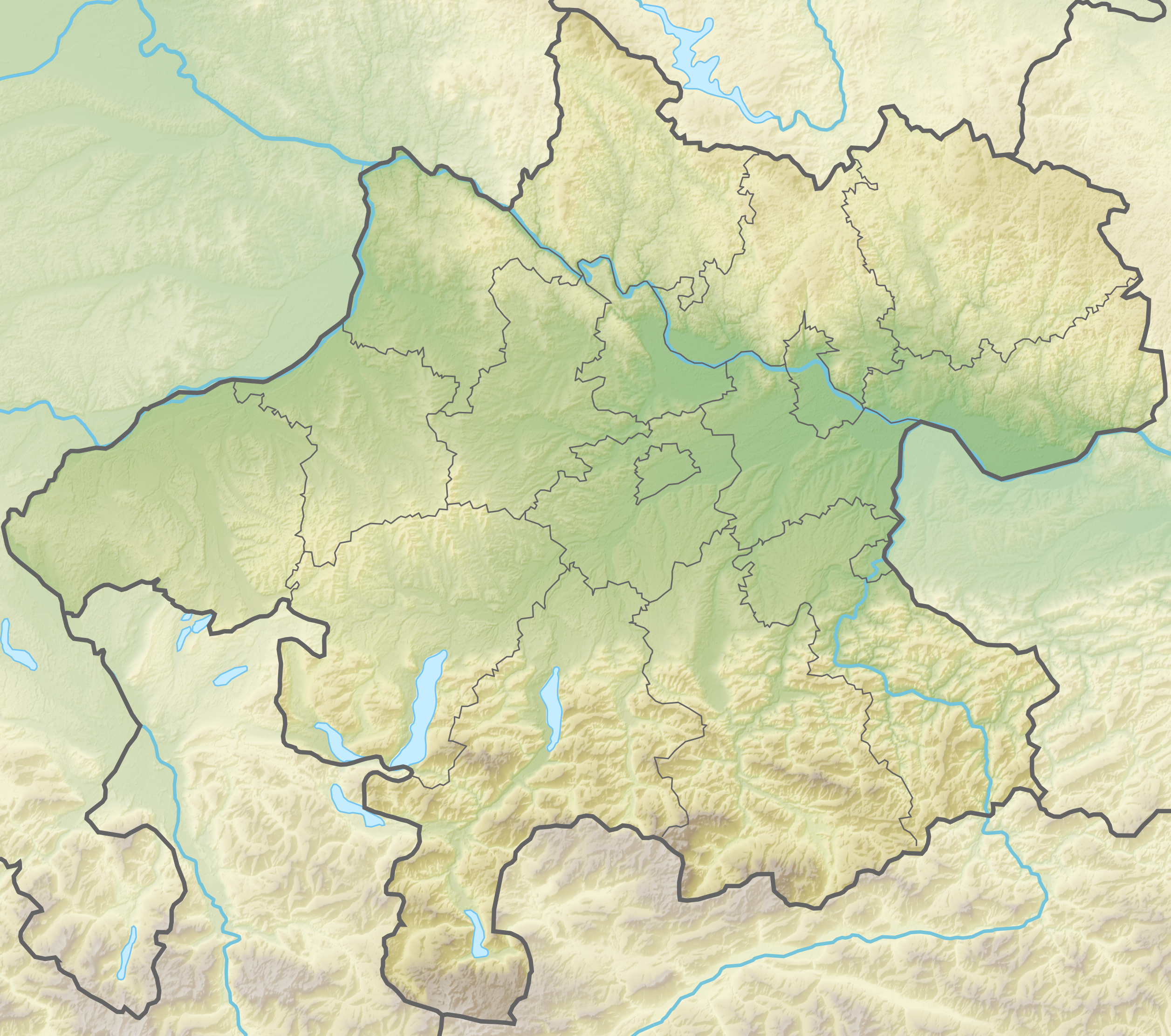
- Location within Upper Austria Location within Austria
- Group: Gosauseen
- Coordinates: 47°30′59.55″N 13°31′41.03″E
- Type: lake
