= Upper Austria =

Upper Austria Oberösterreich
- State
- Federal State of Upper Austria; Bundesland Oberösterreich (German); Bundesland Obaöstareich (Bavarian); Spolková země Horní Rakousy (Czech)
- Flag Coat of arms
- Anthem: Hoamatgsang
- Country: Austria
- Capital: Linz

Government
  - Body: Landtag of Upper Austria
  - Governor: Thomas Stelzer (ÖVP)
  - Deputy Governors: Christine Haberlander (ÖVP); Manfred Haimbuchner (FPÖ)

Area
  - Total: 11,718.32 km^{2} (4,524.47 sq mi)

Population (1 January 2023)
  - Total: 1,522,825
  - Density: 129.9525/km^{2} (336.5754/sq mi)

GDP
  - Total: €82.538 billion (2024)
  - Per capita: €53,771 (2024)
- Time zone: UTC+1 (CET)
  - Summer (DST): UTC+2 (CEST)
- ISO 3166 code: AT-4
- HDI (2022): 0.917 very high · 5th of 9
- NUTS Region: AT3
- Votes in Bundesrat: 12 (of 62)
- Website: Official website

Upper Austria (German: Oberösterreich [ˈoːbɐˌ(ʔ)øːstɐraɪç]; Bavarian: Obaöstareich; Czech: Horní Rakousy [ˈɦorɲiː ˈrakousɪ]) is one of the nine states of Austria. Its capital is Linz. Upper Austria borders Germany and the Czech Republic, as well as the other Austrian states of Lower Austria, Styria, and Salzburg. With an area of 11,982 km^{2} (4,626 sq mi) and 1.49 million inhabitants, Upper Austria is the fourth-largest Austrian state by land area and the third-largest by population.

== History ==
During the period or Roman rule, all parts of modern Upper Austria south to the river Danube belonged to the province of Noricum, until the Migration Period, when the region was overrun by various Germanic peoples.

=== Middle Ages ===
During the early medieval period, the expansion of Avars and Slavs was reaching the Enns River, while regions further to the west, in modern Upper Austria, belonged to the Old Bavarians. By 788, the old Duchy of Bavaria came under the Carolingian rule, and during the following Avar Wars, Carolingian control was expanded further to the east, leading to the establishment of the Avar March. Since the Treaty of Verdun (843), the region of modern Upper Austria, together with the rest of Carolingian Bavaria, belonged to the East Frankish Realm, but it was devastated by frequent Hungarian raids during the first half of the 10th century. Only after the Battle of Lechfeld (955), the region was consolidated as part of the Stem Duchy of Bavaria within the Holy Roman Empire, while further to the east, the Bavarian Eastern March was established.

Within early medieval Bavaria, much of modern Upper Austria belonged to the County of Traungau. In 1156, the expanding March of Austria was elevated to the Duchy of Austria, under the rule of the House of Babenberg, and by the mid-13th century, the region of modern Upper Austria came to be known as the Principality above the Enns River (Fürstentum ob der Enns), a name first recorded in 1264. By the end of the 13th century, the Duchy of Austria had come under rule of the House of Habsburg, and in time, the term "Upper Austria" came to be used but in two different contexts: within Austria proper as a designation for western regions above the Enns, and in the wider scope of Habsburg domains also as one of designations for "outer" and "inner" Habsburg lands beyond the Austria proper. In 1453, the Duchy of Austria was elevated to the Archduchy of Austria, encompassing the region of modern Upper Austria.

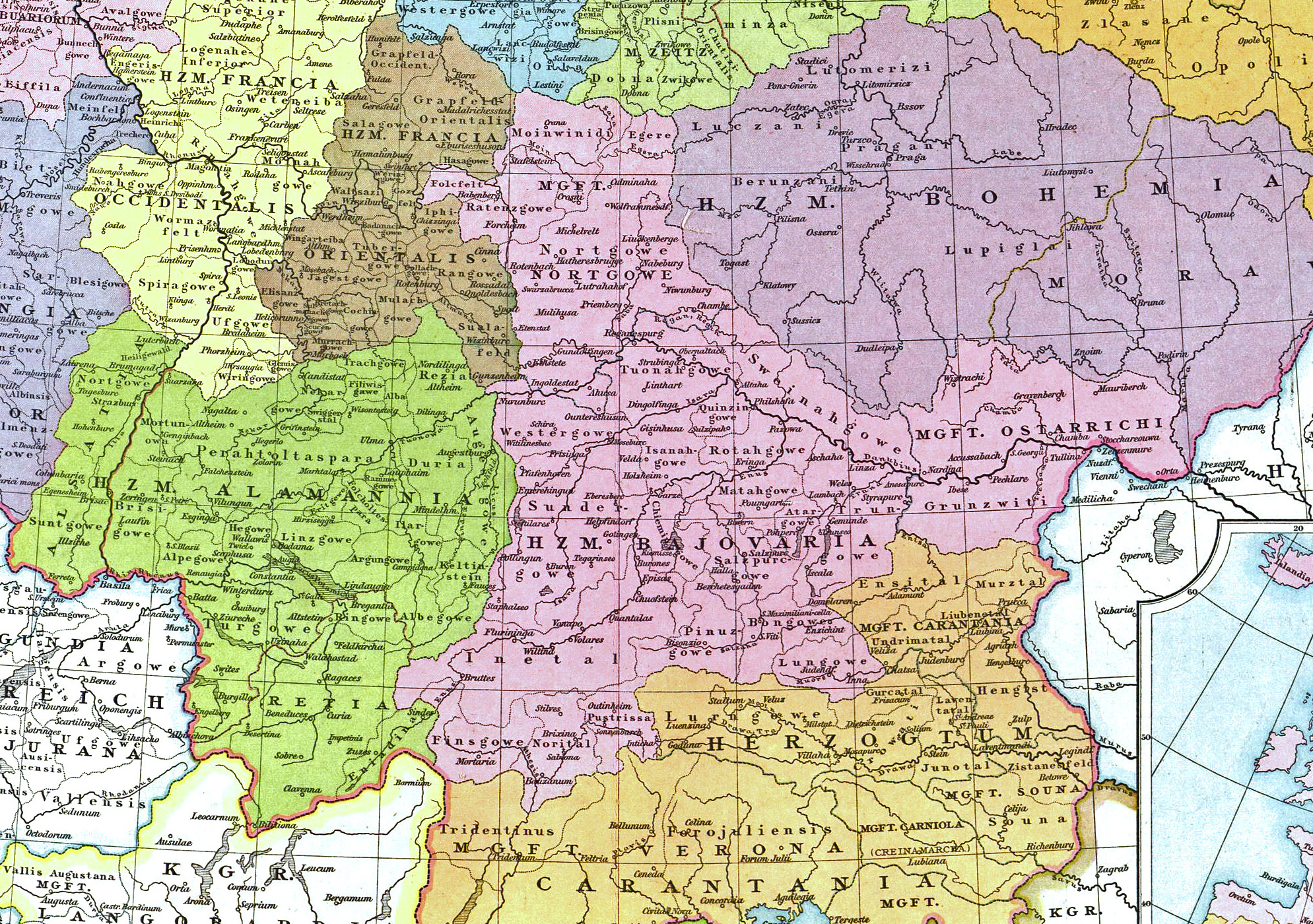
The region of modern Upper Austria within the Stem Duchy of Bavaria in the 11th century

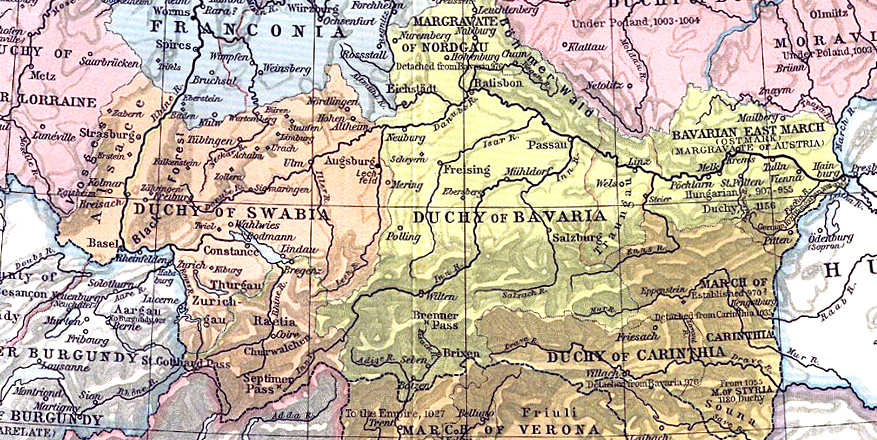
The region of Traungau between Bavaria and Austria in the 12th century

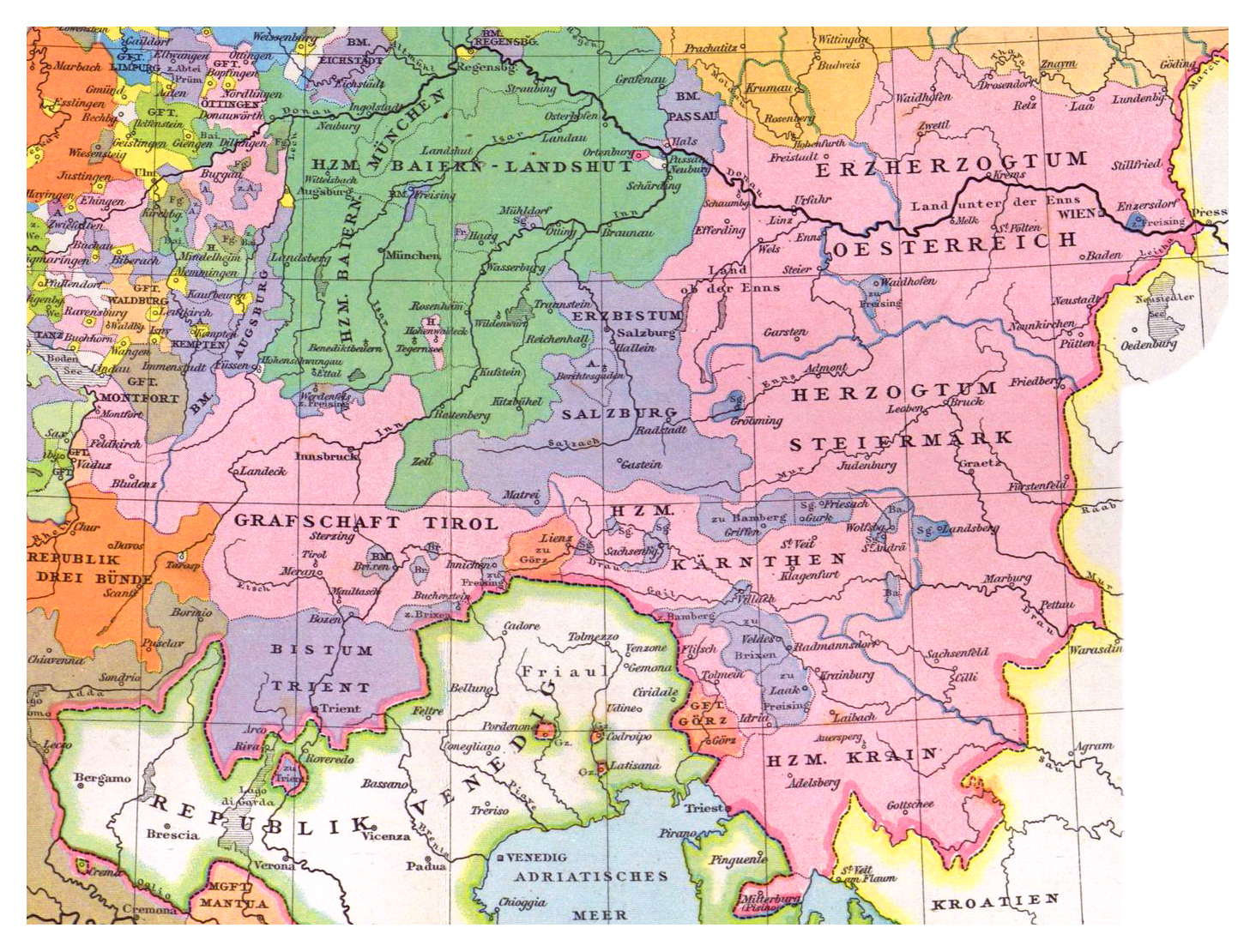
The region of modern Upper Austria within the Archduchy of Austria in the 15th century

=== Early modern era ===
In 1490, the Upper-Austrian area above the Enns, centred in Linz, was given a measure of provincial autonomy within the Archduchy of Austria. In 1521, upon the Habsburg dynastic agreement, concluded at Worms, the Emperor Chales V conferred the governance over the Archduchy of Austria (both parts) to his brother, the Archduke Ferdinand I. By 1550, there was a Protestant majority in the region. In 1564, upon the dynastic division of Habsburg domains, Upper Austria together with Lower Austria and the Bohemian territories, came to the Emperor Maximilian II, and by 1572 the County of Schaunberg was finally annexed to the Upper-Austrian territory.

At the start of the 17th century, the Counter-Reformation was instituted under Emperor Rudolf II and his successor Matthias. After a military campaign, the area was under the control of Bavaria for some years in the early 17th century.

The Innviertel was ceded from the Electorate of Bavaria to Upper Austria in the Treaty of Teschen in 1779. During the Napoleonic Wars, Upper Austria was occupied by the French army on more than one occasion.

Since 1804, upon the creation of the Austrian Empire, both parts of the Archduchy of Austria, above and below the Enns, became integrated into the redefined Habsburg monarchy, while also formally remaining within the Holy Roman Empire until its dissolution in 1806. They later became members of the association of German states and crownlands, known as the German Confederation (1815-1866).

Both the Imperial Patent of 25 April 1848, and the Imperial Patent of 4 March 1849, known as the March Constitution, defined the Archduchy of Austria as encompassing regions above and below the Enns (German: Erzherzogthum Oesterreich ob und unter der Enns), while in practice both of those regions continued to have their distinctive administrations, as reflected in two Imperial Patents issued on 30 December 1849, regulating the scope of two separate provincial governments, one in the Archduchy of Austria above the Enns, and the other in the Archduchy of Austria below the Enns.

Imperial Patent of 26 February 1861, known as the February Patent, also defined two Austrian archduchies, under and above the Enns (German: Unsere Erzherzogthümer: Oesterreich unter der Enns, und Oesterreich ob der Enns), each of them receiving its own provincial statute, issued on the same day (26 February), one for the Archduchy of Austria above the Enns (German: Erzherzogthum Oesterreich ob der Enns), and the other for the Archduchy of Austria below the Enns (German: Erzherzogthum Oesterreich unter der Enns).

In 1867, upon the political reorganization of the Austria-Hungary, both Austrian archduchies remained within the Austrian half of the monarchy (Cisleithania) until the dissolution of 1918.

=== Modern era ===
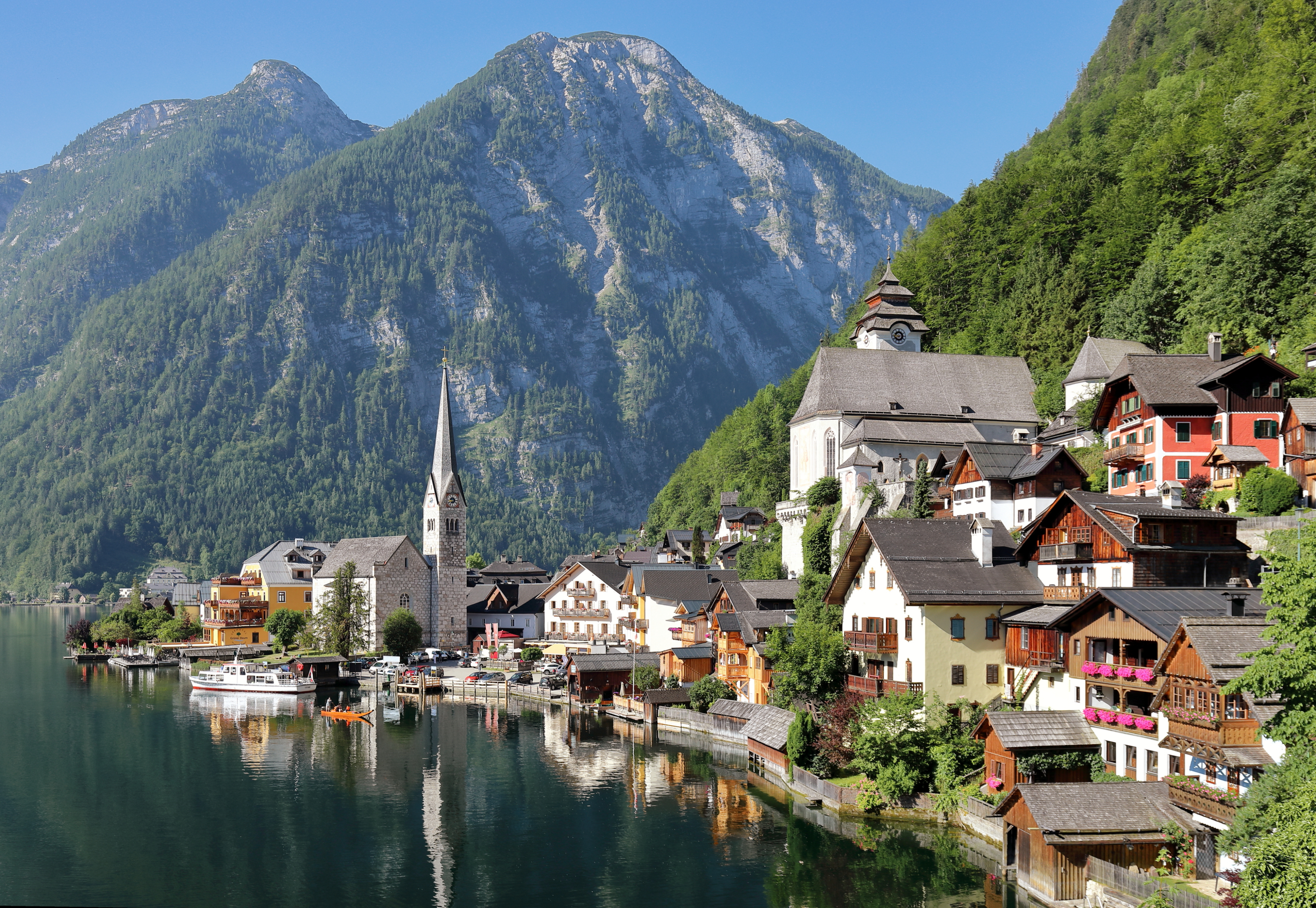
Hallstatt, a village in Upper Austria inside the Salzkammergut

After the collapse of Austria-Hungary in 1918, the term Upper Austria (Oberösterreich) was officially adopted as the new name for the province, within the new Republic of Austria. After Austria was annexed by the Nazi Germany, that was headed by Adolf Hitler, the Nazi dictator who had been born in the Upper Austrian town of Braunau am Inn, Upper Austria became Reichsgau Oberdonau, although this also included the southern part of the Sudetenland, annexed from Czechoslovakia, and a small part of Styria. In 1945, Upper Austria was partitioned between the American zone to the south and the Soviet zone to the north.

== Industry ==
Today, Upper Austria is Austria's leading industrial region. As of 2009, it accounted for approximately a quarter of the country's exports.

== Lakes ==
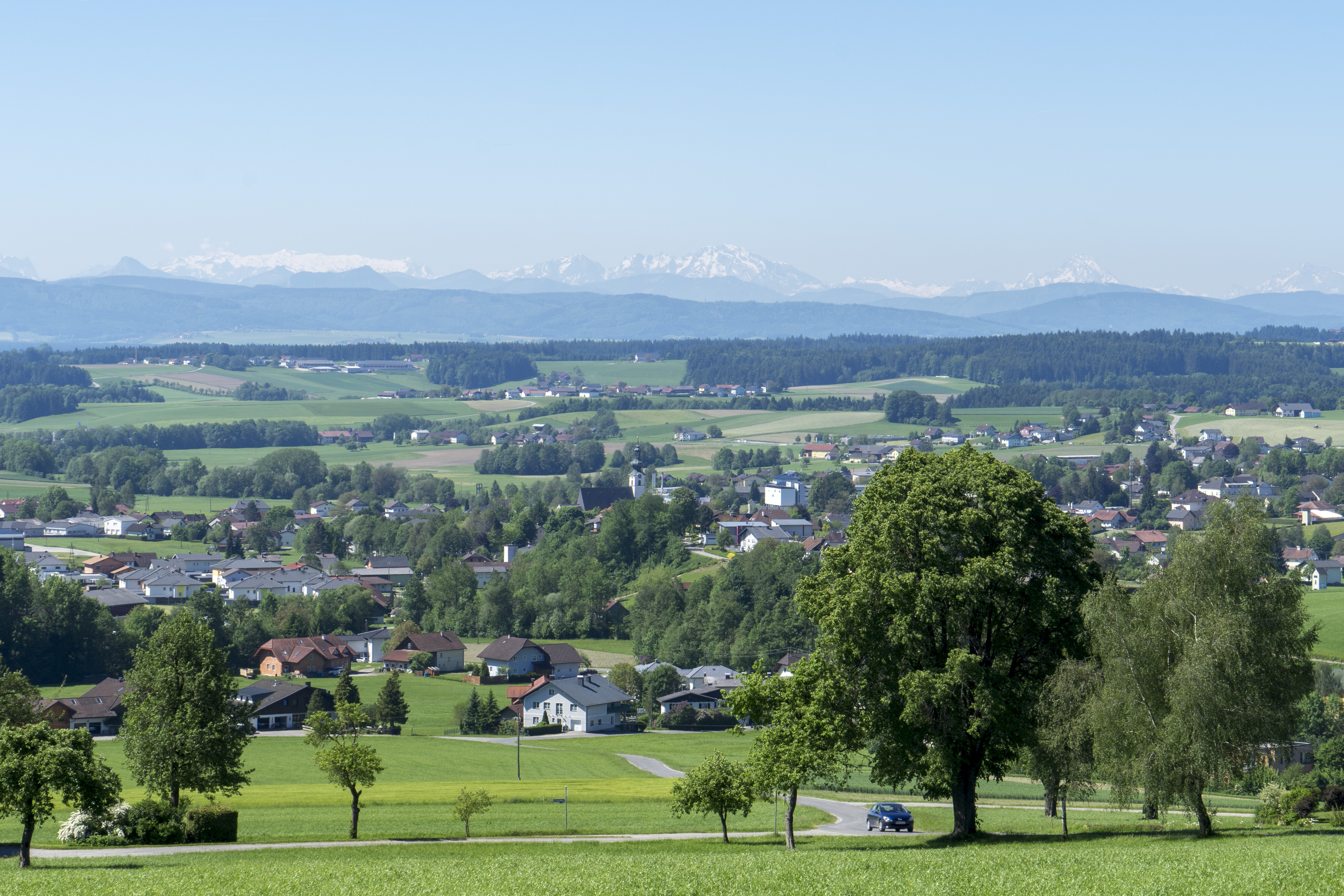
Frankenburg am Hausruck

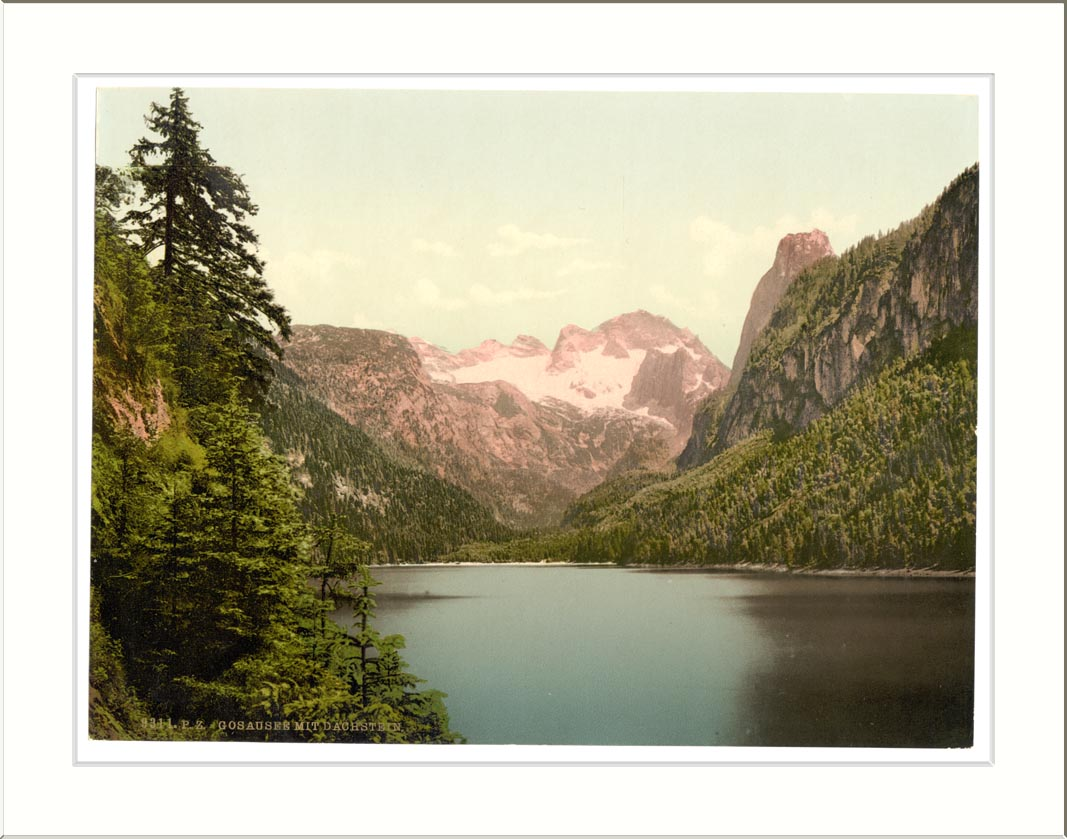
Gosauseen and Dachstein

Attersee (lake)

- Ausee
- Gosauseen
- Höllerersee
- Nussensee
- Oedter See
- Pichlinger See
- Puckinger See
- Rosenhofer Teiche

== Demographics ==
As of January 1, 2021, 1,495,608 people resided in the state, of which 107,318 (7.17 percent) were European Union/European Economic Area/Switzerland/UK citizens and 96,623 (6.46 percent) were third-country nationals.

The majority of Upper Austrians are Christian. In 2001, 79.4 percent of the people still belonged to the Roman Catholic church, about 4.4% were members of the Evangelical Lutheran Church, 4.0 percent were Muslims, and 8.8 percent were of no confession. By the end of 2020, the proportion of Catholics had fallen to 62 percent, while the corresponding proportion of Protestants was about 3.1 percent of the Upper Austrian population.

In the last census in 2021, 73.4% of people were Christians, overwhelmingly Catholic, around 7.4% practiced Islam and 17.3% practiced no faith. By the end of 2022, the proportion of Catholics has decreased to 58.9%, and around 3% of the population were members of Austria's national Lutheran church. At the end of 2023, a good 800,000 of the 1.53 million inhabitants were Catholic and 43,847 or almost 3% were Protestant.

=== Population development ===
After World War II, Upper Austria received a million refugees. The Soviet and American armies occupied Upper Austria as hundreds of thousands of people fled from both sides of the land front.

Historical population
Year	Pop.	±%
1869	736,856	—
1880	760,091	+3.2%
1890	786,496	+3.5%
1900	810,854	+3.1%
1910	853,595	+5.3%
1923	876,698	+2.7%
1934	902,965	+3.0%
1939	927,583	+2.7%
1951	1,108,720	+19.5%
1961	1,131,623	+2.1%
1971	1,229,972	+8.7%
1981	1,269,540	+3.2%
1991	1,333,480	+5.0%
2001	1,376,797	+3.2%
2011	1,413,762	+2.7%
2021	1,504,237	+6.4%
Source: Censuses

== Economy ==
The Gross domestic product (GDP) of the state was 65.9 billion € in 2018, accounting for 17.1% of the Austria's economic output. GDP per capita adjusted for purchasing power was 39,500 € or 131% of the EU27 average in the same year.

== Transport ==
Linz Airport is only passenger airport in the state which provide direct routes to some European destinations. However, other airports such as Munich Airport, Salzburg Airport and Vienna Airport are also used by air travellers from the state.

== Politics ==
The Upper Austrian state constitution defines Upper Austria as an independent state of the democratic Republic of Austria. In its constitution, Upper Austria also declares its support for a united Europe that is committed to democratic, constitutional, social and federal principles as well as the principle of subsidiarity, preserves the autonomy of the regions and ensures their participation in European decision-making. In its regional constitution, Upper Austria defines its position in Europe as an independent, future-oriented and self-confident region that participates in the further development of a united Europe.

Like Styria, Upper Austria is a swing state that usually has a signal character in nationwide elections. The conservative Austrian People's Party dominates in rural areas, the Social Democratic Party of Austria has its strongholds in the cities of Linz, Wels and Steyr or in the Attnang-Puchheim railroad junction, but the right-wing populist Freedom Party of Austria has also traditionally had a strong presence, for example in the Innviertel.

Johanna Preinstorfer, who served as the Mayor of Ohlsdorf from 1982 until 1989, was the first woman to become mayor of any municipality in Upper Austria's history.

== Administrative divisions ==
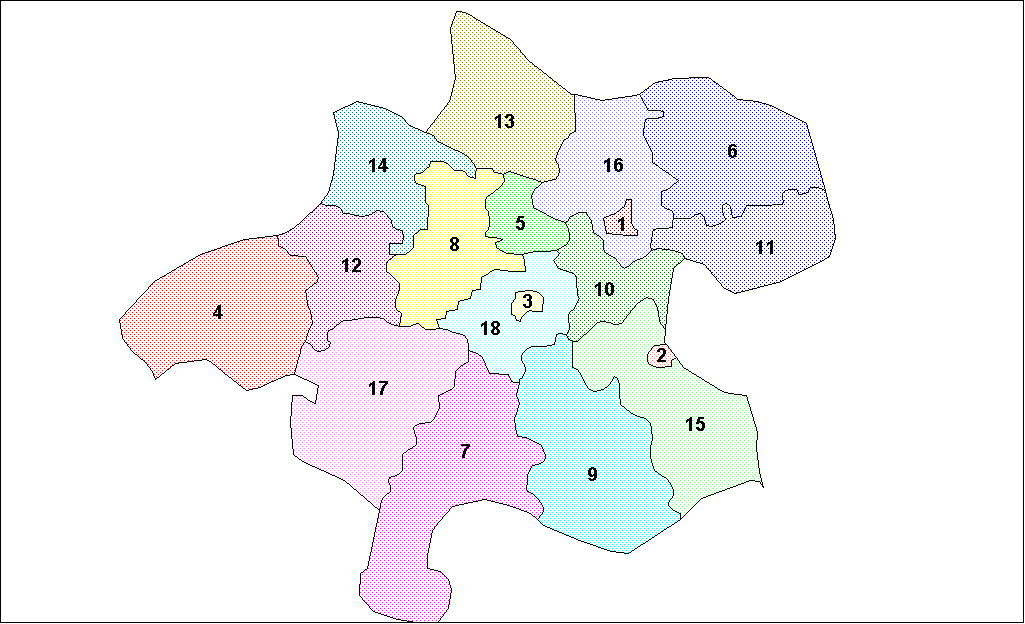

Administratively, the state is divided into 15 districts (Bezirke), three Statutarstädte and 438 municipalities.

=== Statutory cities ===
1. Linz
2. Steyr
3. Wels

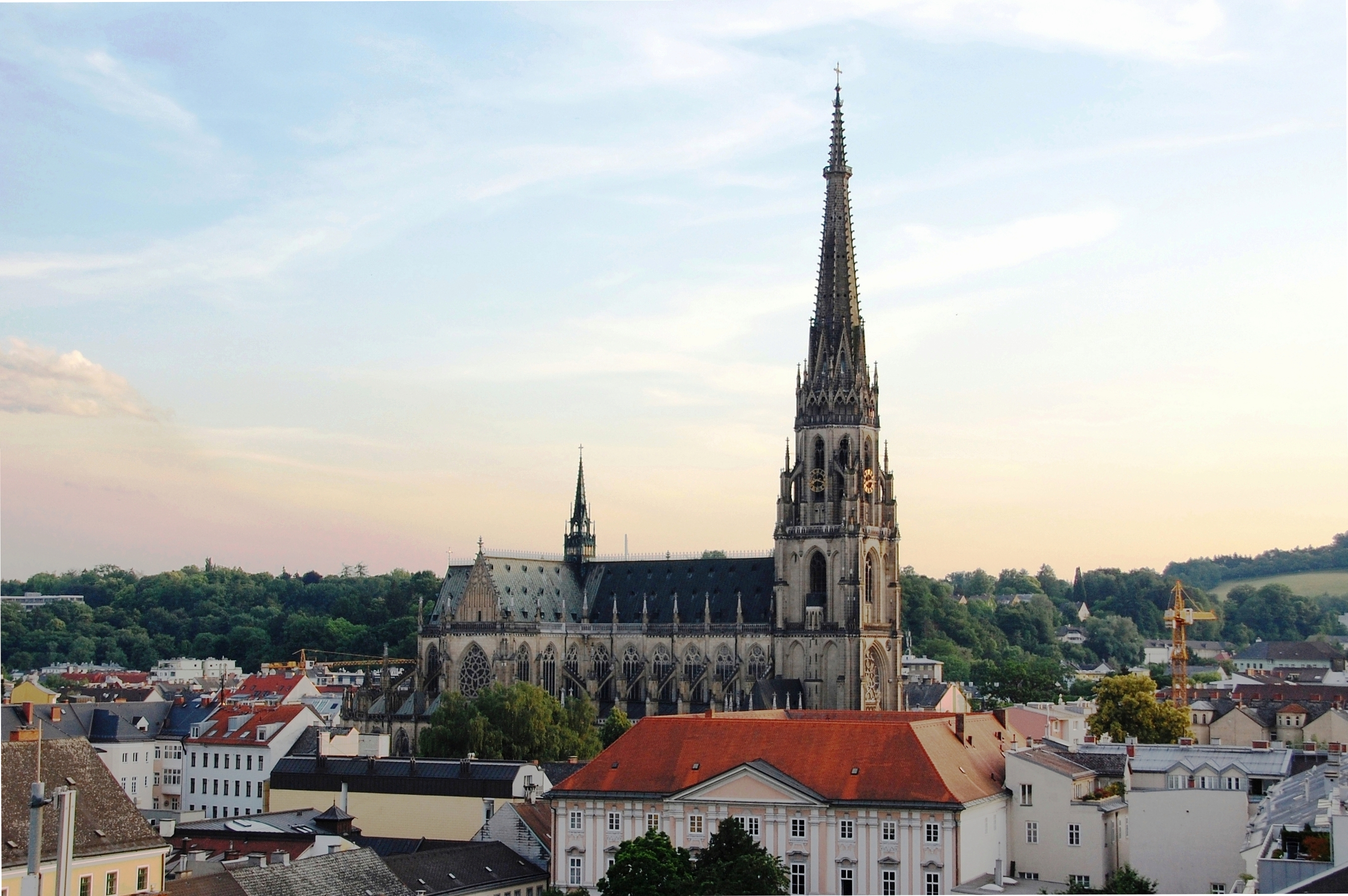
Linz, New Cathedral

=== Districts ===
4. Braunau
5. Eferding
6. Freistadt
7. Gmunden
8. Grieskirchen
9. Kirchdorf
10. Linz-Land
11. Perg
12. Ried
13. Rohrbach
14. Schärding
15. Steyr-Land
16. Urfahr-Umgebung
17. Vöcklabruck
18. Wels-Land

==== Historical regions ====
Historically, Upper Austria was traditionally divided into four regions: Hausruckviertel, Innviertel, Mühlviertel, and Traunviertel.

== See also ==
- History of Austria
- Austro-Bavarian language

== Sources ==
- Appelt, Heinrich (1977). "Die Bedeutung des Titels archidux palatinus Austriae". Festschrift Friedrich Hausmann. Graz: Akademische Druck- und Verlagsanstalt. pp. 15–20.
- Bérenger, Jean (2013) [1994]. A History of the Habsburg Empire 1273-1700. London and New York: Routledge.
- Bowlus, Charles R. (1995). Franks, Moravians, and Magyars: The Struggle for the Middle Danube, 788-907. Philadelphia: University of Pennsylvania Press.
- Pohl, Walter (1995). Die Welt der Babenberger: Schleier, Kreuz und Schwert. Graz: Verlag Styria.
- Reuter, Timothy (2013) [1991]. Germany in the Early Middle Ages c. 800–1056. London and New York: Routledge.
- Sauter, Alexander (2003). Fürstliche Herrschaftsrepräsentation: Die Habsburger im 14. Jahrhundert. Ostfildern: Jan Thorbecke Verlag.
- Wilson, Peter H. (2016). Heart of Europe: A History of the Holy Roman Empire. Cambridge: Harvard University Press.
