= 2010 in Austria =

- Decades: 1990s; 2000s; 2010s; 2020s
- See also: Other events of 2010; List of years in Austria

Events from the year 2010 in Austria

== Incumbents ==
- President: Heinz Fischer
- Chancellor: Werner Faymann

=== Governors ===
- Burgenland: Hans Niessl
- Carinthia: Gerhard Dörfler
- Lower Austria: Erwin Pröll
- Salzburg: Gabi Burgstaller
- Styria: Franz Voves
- Tyrol: Günther Platter
- Upper Austria: Josef Pühringer
- Vienna: Michael Häupl
- Vorarlberg: Herbert Sausgruber

== Events ==
- January 1: The Bundesamt zur Korruptionsprävention und Korruptionsbekämpfung, abbreviated BAK, is established, replacing the Büro für Interne Angelegenheiten
- January 17: The political party List Burgenland is founded
- April 25: 2010 Austrian presidential election
- May 30: 2010 Burgenland state election
- September 26: 2010 Styrian state election
- October 10: 2010 Viennese state election

== Deaths ==
=== January ===
- January 2: Johann Frank, 71, Austrian football player (FK Austria Wien).
- January 3: Otto Breg, 60, Austrian Olympic bobsledder.
- January 8: Otmar Suitner, 87, Austrian conductor.
- January 11: Kurt Liebhart, 76, Austrian Olympic sprint canoer.

=== February ===
- February 19: Bruno Gironcoli, 73, Austrian sculptor, after long illness.

=== March ===
- March 3: Franz Eibler, 85, Austrian Olympic weightlifter.

=== April ===
- April 14: Gerhard Zemann, 70, Austrian actor, heart attack.
- April 19: Manfred Angerer, 56, Austrian musicologist.
- April 20: Heinz Gappmayr, 84, Austrian artist.

=== May ===
- May 15:
  - Besian Idrizaj, 22, Austrian footballer, heart attack.
  - Archduke Rudolf of Austria, 90, Austrian nobleman, youngest son of Emperor Charles I and Zita of Bourbon-Parma.
- May 20: Walter Rudin, 89, Austrian-born American mathematician, Parkinson's disease.

=== June ===
- June 14: Resi Hammerer, 85, Austrian Olympic alpine skier, bronze medalist (1948 Winter Olympics).
- June 17: Hans Dichand, 89, Austrian journalist and newspaper publisher.
- June 21: Ingeborg Pertmayr, 63, Austrian Olympic diver.
- June 27: Andreas Okopenko, 80, Austrian writer.
- June 29: Rudolf Leopold, 85, Austrian art collector.
- June 30: Ditta Zusa Einzinger, 79, Austrian singer (Lolita), cancer.

=== July ===
- July 8: Robert Freitag, 94, Austrian-born Swiss actor.
- July 11: Rudi Strittich, 88, Austrian football player and coach.
- July 26: Brigitte Schwaiger, 61, Austrian writer.

=== August ===
- August 11: Gretel Beer, 89, Austrian-born British cookery and travel writer.
- August 17: Ricardo José Weberberger, 70, Austrian-born Brazilian Roman Catholic prelate, bishop of Barreiras (1979–2010).

=== September ===
- September 16: Hans Wagner, 87, Austrian ice hockey player.
- September 20: Jakob Mayr, 86, Austrian Roman Catholic prelate, Auxiliary Bishop Emeritus of Salzburg.

=== October ===
- October 8:
  - Malcolm Mencer Martin, 89, Austrian-British pediatric endocrinologist, injuries sustained after being hit by car.
  - Karl Prantl, 86, Austrian sculptor, stroke.
- October 16: Friedrich Katz, 83, Austrian anthropologist and historian, cancer.
- October 20: Eva Ibbotson, 85, Austrian-born British novelist (Journey to the River Sea, The Secret of Platform 13).
- October 25: Andreas Maurer, 91, Austrian politician, Landeshauptmann of Lower Austria (1966–1981).

=== November ===
- November 3: Alfons Benedikter, 92, Austrian politician.
- November 7:
  - Kurt Baier, 93, Austrian philosopher.
  - Hedy Stenuf, 88, Austrian Olympic figure skater.
- November 12: Ernst von Glasersfeld, 93, Austrian-born American philosopher (radical constructivism).

=== December ===
- December 9: Alexander Kerst, 86, Austrian actor.
- December 17: Anton Kunz, 95, Austrian Olympic water polo player
- December 28: Agathe von Trapp, 97, Austrian-born American singer, member of the Trapp family (The Sound of Music).
