= 2009 in Austria =

- Decades: 1980s; 1990s; 2000s; 2010s; 2020s
- See also: Other events of 2009; List of years in Austria

Events from the year 2009 in Austria

== Incumbents ==
- President: Heinz Fischer
- Chancellor: Werner Faymann

=== Governors ===
- Burgenland: Hans Niessl
- Carinthia: Gerhard Dörfler
- Lower Austria: Erwin Pröll
- Salzburg: Gabi Burgstaller
- Styria: Franz Voves
- Tyrol: Günther Platter
- Upper Austria: Josef Pühringer
- Vienna: Michael Häupl
- Vorarlberg: Herbert Sausgruber

== Events ==
- January 13: Umar Israilov a former bodyguard of Chechen leader Ramzan Kadyrov is murdered in Vienna
- March 1: 2009 Salzburg state election - Gabi Burgstaller is re-elected as Governor of Salzburg
- March 19: Josef Fritzl pleads guilty to all counts and is imprisoned for life
- May 2: An avalanche on the Schalfkogel mountain range, near Sölden, kills 6 people
- May 24: Several people are injured and the Dera Sach Khand leader Ramanand Dass is killed in the Vienna temple attack
- June 4: 2009 European Parliament election in Austria
- September 20: 2009 Vorarlberg state election - Herbert Sausgruber is re-elected as Governor of Vorarlberg
- September 27: 2009 Upper Austrian state election - Josef Pühringer is re-elected as Governor of Upper Austria
- October 20: A group of students and teachers occupy the assembly hall of the Academy of Fine Arts Vienna, starting the 2009 student protests in Austria

== Deaths ==
=== January ===
- January 1: Johannes Mario Simmel, Austrian writer.
- January 4: Gert Jonke, Austrian poet, playwright and novelist, cancer.
- January 21: Peter Persidis (born 1947), 61, Austrian footballer, cancer.
- January 24: Karl Koller, 79, Austrian footballer, Alzheimer's disease.

=== February ===
- February 3: Mike Maloy, 59, American-born Austrian basketball player, influenza.
- February 19: Edmund Hlawka, 92, Austrian mathematician.

=== March ===
- March 16: Franz Feldinger, 80, Austrian Olympic footballer.
- March 17: Edith Hahn Beer, 95, Austrian author, Holocaust survivor, natural causes.

=== April ===
- April 26: Hans Holzer, 89, Austrian-born American paranormal investigator and author, after long illness.

=== May ===
- May 4: Fritz Muliar, 89, Austrian actor.
- May 13: Monica Bleibtreu, 65, Austrian actress, screenwriter and drama teacher, cancer.
- May 25: Amos Elon, 82, Austrian-born Israeli author and journalist.
- May 26: Doris Mühringer, 88, Austrian poet and children's writer.
- May 30: Herma Kirchschläger, 93, Austrian widow of former president Rudolf Kirchschläger.

=== July ===
- July 2: Bert Schneider, 71, Austrian Grand Prix motorcycle racer.
- July 14: Heinrich Schweiger, 77, Austrian actor, cardiovascular disease.

=== August ===
- August 24: Toni Sailer, 73, Austrian ski racer, laryngeal cancer.

=== September ===
- September 4: Franz Olah, 99, Austrian politician, Interior Minister (1963–1964).
- September 16: Ernst Märzendorfer, 88, Austrian conductor.

=== October ===
- October 4: Hermann Raich, 75, Austrian Roman Catholic Bishop of Wabag (1982–2008).
- October 11: Gustav Kral, 26, Austrian footballer, car accident.
- October 15: Josias Kumpf, 84, Austrian Nazi concentration camp guard.
- October 24: Karl Reisinger, 73, Austrian Olympic judoka.

=== December ===
- December 1: Alberto Martínez, 59, Uruguayan football player (FK Austria Wien), heart failure.
- December 5: Alfred Hrdlicka, 81, Austrian architect and draughtsman.
- December 19: Adelbert St. John, 78, Canadian-born Austrian ice hockey player.
