= 2008 in Austria =

- Decades: 1980s; 1990s; 2000s; 2010s; 2020s
- See also: Other events of 2008; List of years in Austria

Events from the year 2008 in Austria

== Incumbents ==
- President: Heinz Fischer
- Chancellor:
  - Alfred Gusenbauer (till December 2)
  - Werner Faymann (from December 2)

=== Governors ===
- Burgenland: Hans Niessl
- Carinthia:
  - Jörg Haider (till October 11)
  - Gerhard Dörfler (from October 11)
- Lower Austria: Erwin Pröll
- Salzburg: Gabi Burgstaller
- Styria: Franz Voves
- Tyrol:
  - Herwig van Staa (till July 1)
  - Günther Platter (from July 1)
- Upper Austria: Josef Pühringer
- Vienna: Michael Häupl
- Vorarlberg: Herbert Sausgruber

== Events ==
=== March ===
- March 1 – Austria and other countries in Central Europe are hit by Cyclone Emma. Aside from property damage in the millions, one woman was killed by a tree falling on her car.
- March 9 – 2008 Lower Austrian state election: The Austrian People's Party (ÖVP) retained its majority and Erwin Pröll remains Governor of Lower Austria. The major opposition party, the Social Democratic Party of Austria (SPÖ), suffered substantial losses. The Freedom Party of Austria (FPÖ) partially recovered from its 2003 losses, more than doubling its voteshare and tripling its number of seats.

=== April ===
- April 26 – Fritzl Case: Elisabeth Fritzl and her children are released from their captivity, leading to the discovery of the crimes committed by her father Josef Fritzl. He had kept her imprisoned for 24 years in a hidden room of his basement, where he continually sexually abused and raped her, which resulted in the birth of seven children.

=== June ===
- June 8 – 2008 Tyrolean state election: The governing parties Austrian People's Party (ÖVP) and Social Democratic Party of Austria (SPÖ) both lose about ten percent, while the newly founded Fritz Dinkhauser List takes second place with 18.4% of votes. The ÖVP (which had the most votes by far with over 40%) forms a coalition with the SPÖ and replaces Herwig van Staa with Günther Platter as new Governor of Tyrol.

=== July ===
- July 7 – Vice-Chancellor, Finance Minister and Chair of the Austrian People's Party Wilhelm Molterer resigns from the governing grand coalition (led by the Social Democratic Party of Austria) and calls for re-elections.

=== August ===
- August 8 – Werner Faymann is elected as the new Chair of the Social Democratic Party of Austria.

=== September ===
- September 28 – 2008 Austrian legislative election: The governing parties Austrian People's Party (ÖVP) and Social Democratic Party of Austria (SPÖ) both experience their worst election results up to that point, due to common dissatisfaction with the grand coalition. Far-right parties Freedom Party of Austria (FPÖ) and Alliance for the Future of Austria (BZÖ) gain over six percentage points of votes each, but still remain behind the SPÖ and ÖVP.
- September 29 – Following the results of the legislative election Wilhelm Molterer steps down as Chair of the Austrian People's Party.

=== October ===
- October 3 – Alexander Van der Bellen steps down as Spokesperson of The Greens and is provisionally replaced by Eva Glawischnig.
- October 11 – Jörg Haider, Chair of the Alliance for the Future of Austria, dies in a car crash near Köttmansdorf in the state of Carinthia.

=== November ===
- November 23 – Despite their losses in the 2008 Austrian legislative election the previous ruling parties Austrian People's Party (ÖVP) and Social Democratic Party of Austria (SPÖ) agree to renew the grand coalition.
- November 29 – Josef Pröll is elected as the new Chair of the Austrian People's Party.

=== December ===
- December 2 – The new government, later known as First Faymann government, is officially sworn in. Werner Faymann (Chair of the Social Democratic Party) becomes Chancellor of Austria, while Josef Pröll (Chair of the Austrian People's Party) is declared Vice-Chancellor of Austria.

== Sports ==
- UEFA Euro 2008

== Deaths ==
=== January ===
- January 13 – Walter Zimper, 65, Austrian politician (b. 1942).
- January 14 – Vincenz Liechtenstein, 57, Austrian politician (b. 1950).

=== February ===
- February 6 – Kurt Nemetz, 81, Austrian Olympic cyclist (b. 1926).
- February 10 – Peter Marginter, 73, Austrian author (b. 1934).
- February 21 – Hans Janitschek, 73, Austrian journalist, heart attack (b. 1934).

=== March ===
- March 17 – Claude Farell, 93, Austrian actress (b. 1918).
- March 29 – Josef Mikl, 78, Austrian painter, cancer (1929).

=== April ===
- April 9 – Daniela Klemenschits, 25, Austrian tennis player, abdominal cancer (b. 1982).
- April 28 – Hans Eder, 81, Austrian Olympic skier (b. 1927).

=== May ===
- May 7 – Gernot Zippe, 90, Austrian engineer (b. 1917).
- May 27 – Ed Arno, 91, Austrian-American cartoonist, caricaturist, illustrator and comics artist (b. 1916).

=== June ===
- June 7 – Horst Skoff, 39, Austrian tennis player, heart attack (b. 1968).
- June 17 – Josef Pohnetal, 83, Austrian Olympic cyclist (b. 1925).
- June 23 – Judith Holzmeister, 88, Austrian actress (b. 1920).

=== August ===
- August 5 – Bruno Dallansky, 79, Austrian actor (b. 1928).
- August 11
  - Günther Schifter, 84, Austrian journalist and radio presenter (b. 1923).
  - Fred Sinowatz, 79, Austrian politician, chancellor of Austria (1983–1986) (b. 1929).
- August 16 – Alfred Rainer, 20, Austrian Nordic combined skier, paragliding accident (b. 1987).

=== October ===
- October 10 – Kurt Weinzierl, 77, Austrian actor (b. 1931).
- October 11 – Jörg Haider, 58, Austrian politician, Governor of Carinthia (1989–1991, since 1999), leader of the FPÖ and BZÖ, car accident (b. 1950).
- October 24 – Helmut Zilk, 81, Austrian politician, Mayor of Vienna (1984–1994), heart failure (b. 1927).

=== November ===
- November 26 – Edwin Ernest Salpeter, 83, Austrian-born American astrophysicist, leukemia (b. 1924).

=== December ===
- December 26 – Eberhard Kneisl, 92, Austrian Olympic alpine skier (b. 1916).
- December 30 – Paul Hofmann, 96, Austrian writer, informant against the Nazis (b. 1912).
