= Andrea Kaufmann =

Austrian politician (born 1969)

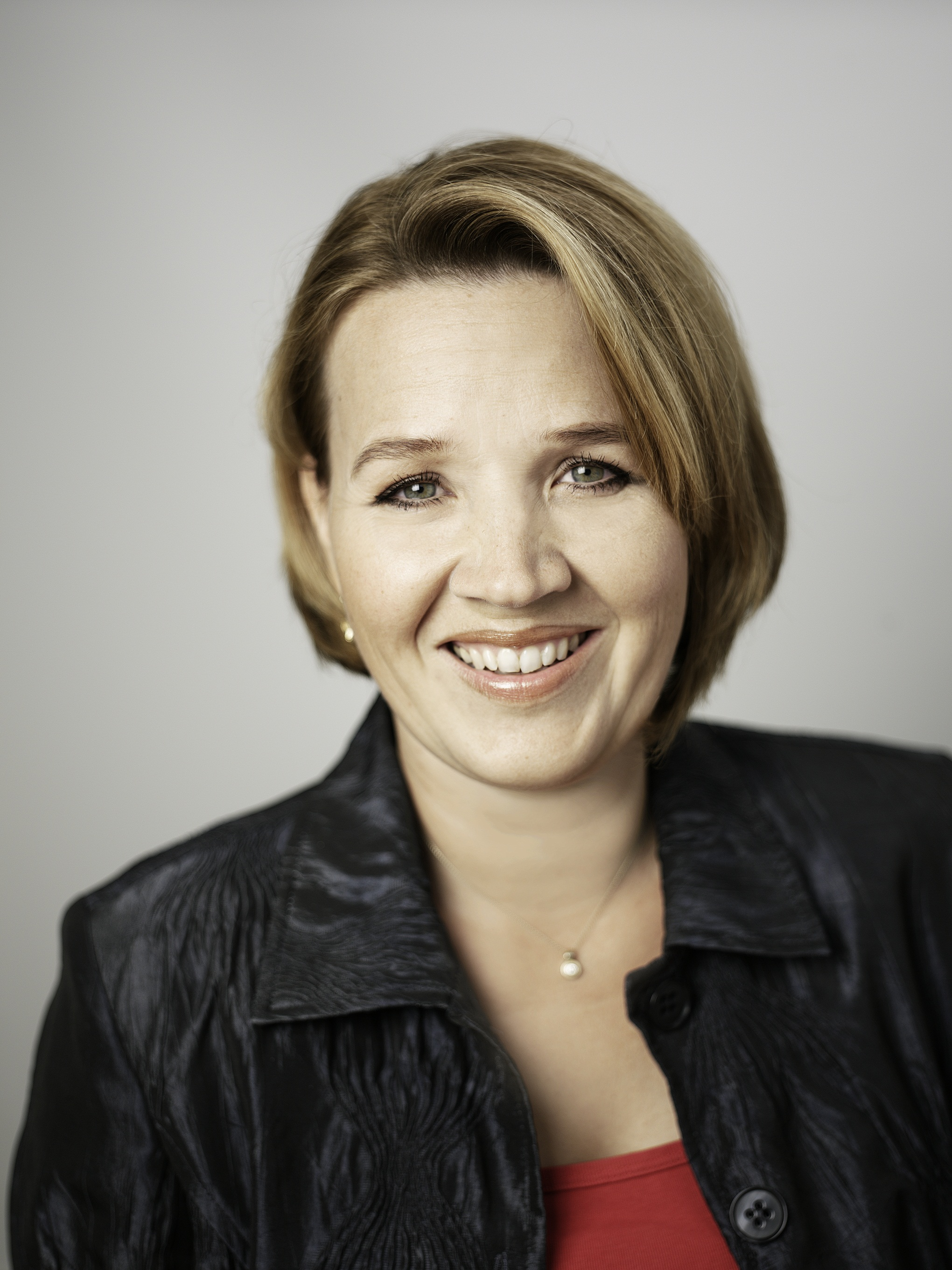
Andrea Kaufmann (2009)

Andrea Kaufmann (née Blenk; born 19 March 1969, in Dornbirn, Austria) is an Austrian politician for the Austrian People's Party (ÖVP) from Vorarlberg. She was, from 2009 to 2013, a regional member of the Vorarlberg state government and is currently mayor of Dornbirn.

Kaufmann is the daughter of national councilman Wolfgang Blenk. Andrea Kaufmann is married and lives with her husband and two daughters and two sons in Dornbirn.

== Education ==
Kaufmann attended the Higher Commercial School in Rankweil, where she graduated. She then began, in 1988, to study international business at the Vienna University of Economics and in 1989 a study of economics at the University of Konstanz. From 2000 to 2002, Kaufmann also attended university courses for Civic Education in Schloss Hofen. Currently, she is an economist with a diploma working on her doctoral studies in political science at the University of Innsbruck.

Kaufmann was professionally employed from 1994 to 1998 at the Raiffeisenbank in Bludenz.

== Political career ==
Kaufmann's beginnings in politics began in the 90s in the youth branch of the ÖVP in Dornbirn. Subsequently, she was elected to the regional and federal executive board in the youth branch. Since 2003, she has been a merchant in the Austrian Workers 'and Employees' Federation State as well as Chairman Deputy. Before turning into the country's politics, Kaufmann was active as a councilor for culture, family and education in her hometown. After the Vorarlberg State Election, 2009, which resulted in an ÖVP majority government, she was, on 14 October 2009, elected into the Vorarlberg Landtag as Regional Minister for governor Herbert Sausgruber. She subsequently held the departments of culture, science and the promotion of studies, further education, archives, and librarianship as well as music schools.

On 20 May 2011, Kaufmann was selected as deputy in Innsbruck by former ÖVP Federal Party chairman Michael Spindelegger. Following the resignation of Rainer Gögele as councillor, she took over on 6 June 2012 and took over most of the departments previously conducted by Gögele: construction, mechanical, electrical, cable cars and lift technology, while the two previously also ran by Gögele, health and disability assistance, were transferred to Christian Bernhard. In May 2013, she resigned as a provincial minister in order to be the first woman to become the mayor of her home town of Dornbirn. Subsequently, she was elected on 29 May 2013 by the town council of Dornbirn. In the first election as incumbent mayor in her tenure, Kaufmann was reelected mayor of Dornbirn on 15 March 2015 with 51.29% of the Dornbirn population with 51.29% of the votes in office.
