= 2007 in Austria =

- Decades: 1980s; 1990s; 2000s; 2010s; 2020s
- See also: Other events of 2007; List of years in Austria

The following lists events that happened during 2007 in Austria.

== Incumbents ==
- President: Heinz Fischer
- Chancellor
  - Wolfgang Schüssel (until 11 January)
  - Alfred Gusenbauer (starting 11 January)

=== Governors ===
- Burgenland: Hans Niessl
- Carinthia: Jörg Haider
- Lower Austria: Erwin Pröll
- Salzburg: Gabi Burgstaller
- Styria: Franz Voves
- Tyrol: Herwig van Staa
- Upper Austria: Josef Pühringer
- Vienna: Michael Häupl
- Vorarlberg: Herbert Sausgruber

== Events ==
=== January ===
- January 8 – The Social Democratic Party of Austria (SPÖ) and the Austrian People's Party (ÖVP) agree on a coalition government after the October 2006 Austrian elections. Both parties will get an equal share of ministers with the SPÖ's Alfred Gusenbauer set to become Chancellor of Austria, while the ÖVP had more success in implementing their demands in the coalition agreement. The government will be sworn in on 11 January.
- January 9 – The Austrian People's Party (ÖVP), the future minority partner in the grand coalition government that will be sworn in on January 11, 2007, announces its future ministers.
- January 10 – The Social Democratic Party of Austria, the future majority partner in the grand coalition government that will be sworn in on January 11, 2007, announces its future ministers.
- January 11 – Austria's new government is sworn in under Chancellor Alfred Gusenbauer (SPÖ) and Vice-Chancellor Wilhelm Molterer (ÖVP).
- January 23 – Volodymyr Yelchenko, Ukraine's ambassador to Austria, is fired after he makes an unauthorized offer of a visa to Ukraine for exiled Turkmen opposition leader Hudaýberdi Ozarow. Ozarow and opposition leader Nurmuhammet Hanamow allegedly visited Kyiv the week before and met with Ukrainian Transportation Minister Mykola Rudkovskiy, but this has been denied by several officials.

=== February ===
- February 11 – Rakhat Aliyev, son-in-law of Kazakh President Nursultan Nazarbayev and First Vice Foreign Minister, is demoted to ambassador to Austria for the second time amid accusations he stole money from Nurbank bank and alleged involvement in the kidnapping and murdering of two Nurbank officials.

=== March ===
- March 5 – 2007 Zell am See mid-air collision: Eight people die when an Aérospatiale SA 332 Super Puma helicopter, operated by Helog, collided with a private Diamond DV20 Katana light aircraft near Zell am See, Austria.

=== October ===
- October 7 – Burgenland local elections
- October 29 – The Disappearance of Aeryn Gillern: American citizen Aeryn Gillern disappeared without explanation in Vienna.

== Sport ==
- 2006–07 Austrian Football Bundesliga
- 2006–07 Austrian Football First League
- 2006–07 Austrian Hockey League season

== Deaths ==
=== January ===
- January 6 – Annelies Reinhold, 90, Austrian actress, (b. 1917).
- January 19 – Gerhard Bronner, 84, composer and cabaret artist, complications following a stroke.

=== February ===
- February 5 – Alfred Worm, 61, investigative journalist, heart attack.
- February 15 – Robert Adler, 93, co-inventor of the TV remote control, heart failure.
- February 17 – Jakov Lind, 80, writer, painter and actor.

=== March ===
- March 13 – Herbert Fux, 79, Austrian actor and politician, (b. 1927).
- March 29 – Myokyo-ni, 86, Buddhist nun, head of the Zen Centre in London.
- March 31 – Paul Watzlawick, 85, psychologist and philosopher.

=== May ===
- May 5 – Gusti Wolf, 95, actress.
- May 17 – Egmont Foregger, 84, Austrian jurist, official and politician, severe illness, (b. 1922).

=== June ===
- June 14 – Kurt Waldheim, 88, President (1986–1992), UN Sec-General (1972–1981), WWII Wehrmacht officer, heart failure.
- June 21 – Georg Danzer, 60, singer, lung cancer.

=== July ===
- July 1 – Joerg Kalt, 40, cinematographer, suicide.
- July 16 – Kurt Steyrer, 87, health minister and Socialist presidential candidate, after short illness.

=== August ===
- August 4 – Raul Hilberg, 81, Jewish Holocaust historian, lung cancer.
- August 8 – Julius Wess, 73, physicist.
- August 11 – Franz Antel, 94, film director.

=== September ===
- September 9 – Helmut Senekowitsch, 73, football player and manager.
- September 11 – Joe Zawinul, 75, jazz keyboardist and composer, founder of Weather Report, cancer.
- September 24 – André Gorz, 84, social philosopher, suicide.

=== October ===
- October 2 – Elfi von Dassanowsky, 83, opera singer, actress and film producer.
- October 11 – Werner von Trapp, 91, musician and singer, member of the Trapp Family Singers who inspired The Sound of Music.

=== November ===
- November 18 – Ellen Preis, 95, fencer, gold medallist at the 1932 Summer Olympics, kidney failure.
- November 23 – Peter Burgstaller, 43, former footballer, shot.

=== December ===
- December 5 – Alois Kracher, 48, winemaker, pancreatic cancer.
- December 9 – Kurt Schmied, 81, footballer, former member of the national team.
- December 11 – Carl Ludwig, Archduke of Austria, 89, son of Emperor Charles I of Austria.
- December 12 – Alfons Maria Stickler, 97, prelate of the Roman Catholic Church.
- December 24 – Andreas Matzbacher, 25, cyclist, car accident.
