= Ivo de Vento =

Ivo de Vento (c. 1544, in Antwerp – 3 September 1575, in Munich) was a Franco-Flemish composer, organist and Kapellmeister of the High Renaissance.

== Life ==
From numerous receipts sent to his father in Antwerp it is known that Ivo de Vento was present at the ducal court of Albert V in Munich around September 1556 or a little later, one of a number of boy singers recruited from the Spanish Netherlands, possibly chosen by Orlando di Lasso. He was employed under Hofkapellmeister Ludwig Daser until September 1559, when his voice broke and he was given a stipend to study in Venice. Presumably his teachers would have included Claudio Merulo, the organist at San Marco, and Annibale Padovano. Italian influence is evident in a 6-part Battaglia printed in a Venetian anthology of 1564. In 1563 he returned to Munich as organist, a post shared with two Italian colleagues in the newly expanded Hofkapelle now led by Orlando di Lasso. Vento was fostered by the famous composer, as shown by inclusion of his work in a collection of 6-part masses (1564/65) as well as the 1569 Madrigals and its 1575 sequel.

In summer of 1568 the crown prince Wilhelm V, having married Renata of Lorraine, moved part of the court to Landshut and made Vento director of the affiliated kapelle. For unknown reasons this position was taken over a year later by Antonius Gosswin, Vento remaining as organist and director of the boys, among whom was Leonhard Lechner. Vento was back at the Munich court as organist at the start of 1570, months before the dissolution of the Landshut Kapelle. Though Lasso's letters give no evidence, Vento could have studied with him, since the masses found in mss of the 1560s and 70's show his influence, and a number of the 5-part Latinae cantiones (1570) are on texts also set by Lasso. Nevertheless, his style is not especially dependent on Lasso's. From 1569 on Vento was unusually productive, the Munich printer Adam Berg issuing 11 collections, including four volumes of motets and a Viersprachendruck, a title which alludes to Lasso's own four-language publication.

Ivo de Vento died in Munich in September 1575, barely 31 years old and leaving a widow and at least one son, Ferdinand de Venndo. Ferdinand succeeded him at the Munich court, became trumpeter to Archduke Ferdinand in Graz in 1599 and remained in the Emperor's service, dying in 1623.

== Works ==
Gesamtausgabe: Ivo de Vento. Sämtliche Werke, 5 Bände, Wiesbaden 1998 und folgende; Band 1 und 2: Motetten, herausgegeben von August de Groote 1998; Band 3 und 4: Deutsche Lieder, herausgegeben von Nicole Schwindt 2002 und 2003; Band 5: Viersprachendruck und sonstige Einzelwerke, herausgegeben von August de Groote 2004.

- Messen
  - Missa „Ad placitum“ 4vv
  - Missa „Jesu nostra redemptio“ 6vv, 1565
  - Missa „Je ne veulx riens“ 4-5vv, circa 1565–1570
  - Missa „Surrexit pastor bonus“ 5vv, 1572, teilweise auch Orlando di Lasso zugeschrieben
- Motetten und andere geistliche Werke
  - „Latinae cantiones, quas vulgo motteta vocant, quatuor vocum, suavissima melodia, etiam instrumentis musicis attemperatae“, 1569
  - „Latinae cantiones, quas vulgo motteta vocant, quinque vocum, suavissima melodia, etiam instrumentis musicis attemperatae“, 1570, daraus „Tribularer si nescirem“ als Separatdruck 1580
  - „Liber motettorum quatuor vocum“, 1571
  - „Mutetae aliquot sacrae quatuor vocum, quae cum vivae voci, tum omnis generis instrumentis musicis commodissime applicare possunt“, 1574
  - „Quinque mutetae […] quarum prior moteta novem […] reliquot vero omnes quinque sunt vocum“, 1575
  - „Grates nunc omnes“ zu fünf Stimmen
  - „Letania“ zu vier Stimmen
  - Te Deum zu vier Stimmen
- Lieder
  - „Newe Teutsche Liedlein mit Fünff stimmen welche gantz lieblich zu singen und auff allerley Instrumenten zu gebrauchen“, 1569, 1571, 1582
  - „Newe Teutsche Lieder mit viern fünff und sechs stimmen wölche gantz lieblich zu singen und auff allerley Instrumenten zu gebrauchen“, 1570
  - „Newe Teutsche Lieder Mit vier stimmen sampt zwayen Dialogen deren ayner mit achten der ander mit sibnen gantz lieblich zu singen und auff allerley Instrumenten zu gebrauchen“, 1571, 1577
  - „Newe Teutsche Lieder Mit dreyen stimmen wölche lieblich zu singen und auff allerley Instrumenten zu gebrauchen“, 1572, 1577, 1583, 1591; Nachdruck einzelner Lieder hieraus in Allerley Kurtzweilige Teutsche Liedlein, Nürnberg 1614
  - „Schöne außerlesene newe Teutsche Lieder mit 4 stimmen wölche nit allein lieblich zu singen sonder auch auf allerley Instrumenten zu gebrauchen seind“, 1572
  - „Teutsche Lieder mit fünff stimmen sampt einem Dialogo mit achten nit allein lieblich zu singen sonder auch allerhand Instrumenten wol und artlich zu gebrauchen“, 1573
  - „Quinque motetae […] et quatuor Germanicae: quarum […] posteriores duae Germanicae cantiones octo, reliquot vero omnes quinque sunt vocum“, 1575
- Madrigale, Chansons und Villanellen
  - 2 Madrigale und 2 Chansons in dem Sammelband „Quinque motetae“, 1575
  - Einzelne Madrigale und Villanellen in 8 Handschriften
- Unechtes Werk (Fehlzuschreibung)
  - „Frewe dich des weibes deiner Jugendt“ zu fünf Stimmen (nicht von Ivo de Vento)

== Literatur (Auswahl) ==
- Robert Eitner: Vento, Jvo de, in: Allgemeine Deutsche Biographie (ADB), Band 39, Duncker & Humblot, Leipzig 1895, Seite 607
- Kurt Huber: Ivo de Vento (ca. 1540–1575), Dissertation, Ludwig-Maximilians-Universität München, Munich 1917
- James Haar: Pace non trovo: A Literary and Musical Parody, in Musica Disciplina Nr. 20, 1966, Seite 95–149
- Martin Rößler (editor): Ivo de Vento: Geistliche Liedsätze, Neuhausen-Stuttgart 1973
- P. Röckl: Das Musikleben am Hofe Wilhelms V. auf der Burg Trausnitz 1568–1579, in Verhandlungen des Historischen Vereins für Niederbayern Nr. 99, 1973, pp. 99–127
- J. M. Ongaro: Venetian Printed Anthologies of Music in the 1560s and the Role of the Editor, in: The Dissemination of Music. Studies in the History of Music Publishing, herausgegeben von H. Lenneberg, Lausanne 1994, Seite 43–69
- M. L. Göllner: Lassos Motetten nach Hymnentexten und ihre Parodiemessen von Ivo de Vento und Andrea Gabrieli, in: Kongressbericht München 1994, München 1996, Seite 87–100 (= Bayerische Akademie der Wissenschafte, Philosophisch-historische Klasse, Abhandlung Neue Folge 111)
- August de Groote: Ivo de Vento, in: Orlandus Lassus and his time, herausgegeben von Ignace Bossuyt, Antwerpen 1995, ISBN 90-6853-110-7, Seite 295–314
- Nicole Schwindt: »Philonellae« - Die Anfänge der deutschen Villanella zwischen Tricinium und Napolitana, in: Gattungen und Formen des europäischen Liedes vom 14. bis 16. Jahrhundert, herausgegeben von Michael Zywietz / V. Honemann / Chr. Bettels, Münster 2005, Seite 243–283 (= Studien und Texte zum Mittelalter und zur frühen Neuzeit Nr. 8)
- Alexander Rausch: Vento (Fento, Defendo), Familie (http://www.musiklexikon.ac.at/ml/musik_V/Vento_Familie.xml), in: Oesterreichisches Musiklexikon, Online edition, Vienna 2002 und folgende, ISBN 3-7001-3077-5; Druckausgabe: volume 5, Austrian Academy of Sciences edition, Vienna2006, ISBN 3-7001-3067-8
