= Malcolm Martin =

Malcolm Martin may refer to:

- Malcolm Mencer Martin (1920–2010), Austrian-British pediatric endocrinologist
- Thelonious Martin (real name Malcolm Martin; born 1992), American record producer

== See also ==
- Malcolm W. Martin Memorial Park, a park in East St. Louis, Illinois
