= Firmisanschneide =

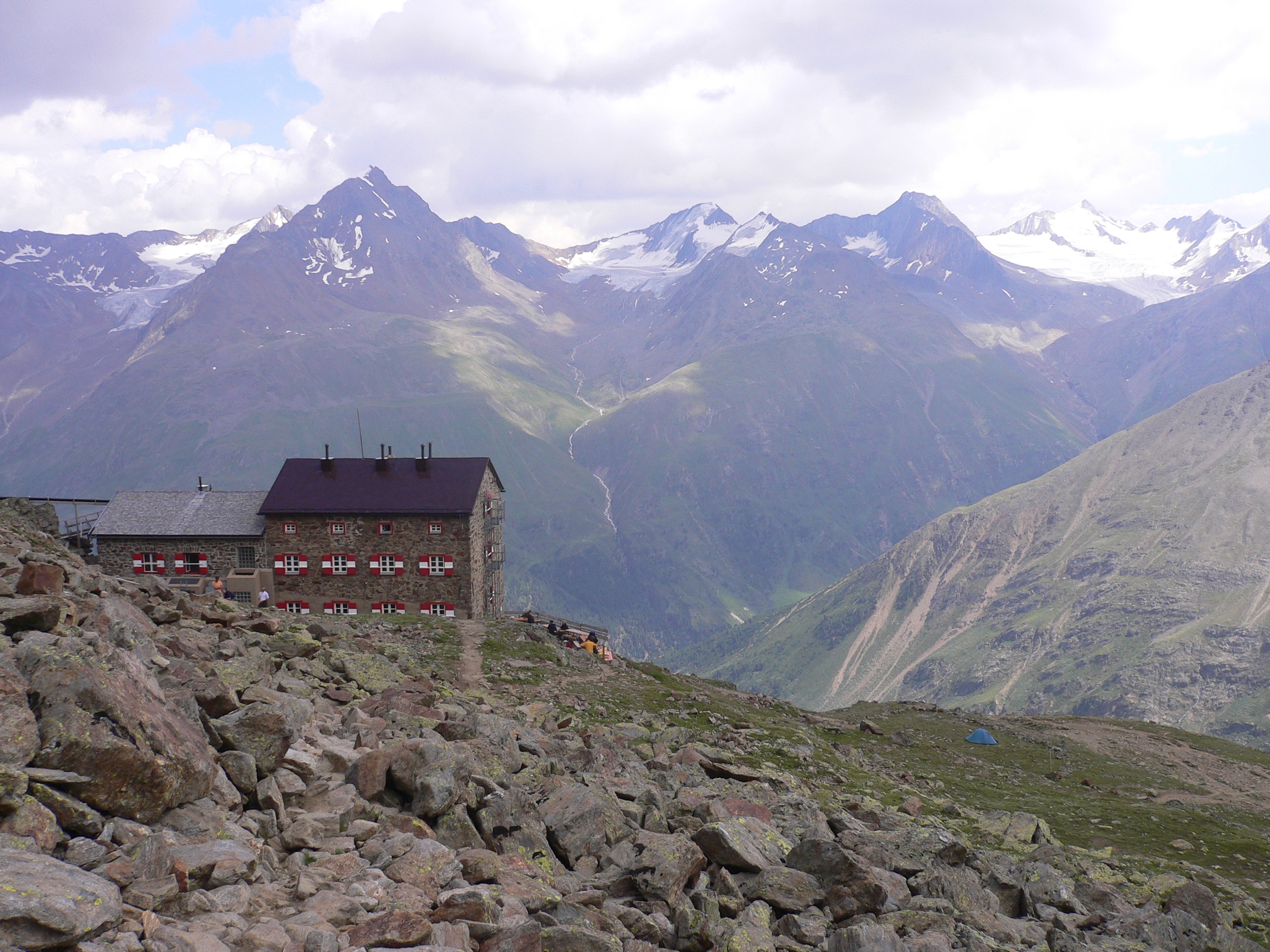
- Breslauer Hütte with a view over the upper Ötz valley on, from left to right, Ramolkogel (3550 m), Spiegelkogel (3426 m), Firmisanschneid (3491 m), and Schalfkogel (3540 m).

Highest point
- Elevation: 3,491 m (11,453 ft)
- Prominence: 203 m (666 ft)
- Parent peak: Schalfkogel
- Coordinates: 46°49′11″N 10°57′13″E

Geography
- Location within Austria
- Location: Tyrol, Austria
- Parent range: Ötztal Alps

Climbing
- First ascent: 1870 by Franz Senn, Ludwig Darmstaedter, Anselm Klotz (guide)
- Easiest route: vom Ramolhaus zum Spiegeljoch über den Nordostgrat zum Gipfel in leichter Kletterei

The Firmisanschneide is a peak in the Schnalskamm group of the Ötztal Alps.
