= Ramolkogel =

Mountain in the Ötztal Alps

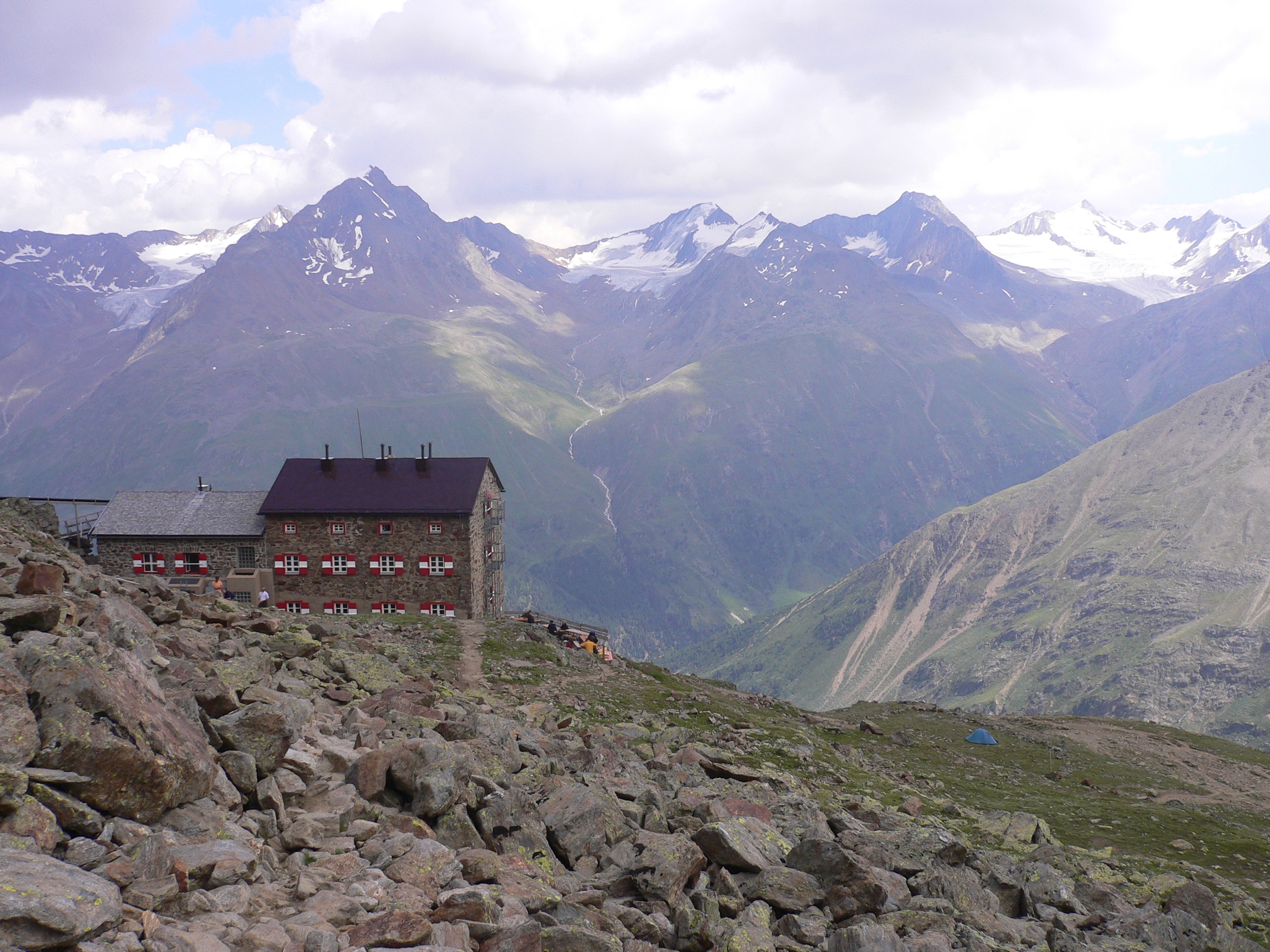
- Breslauer Hütte with a view over the upper Ötz valley on, from left to right, Ramolkogel (3550 m), Spiegelkogel (3426 m), Firmisanschneide (3491 m), and Schalfkogel (3540 m).

Highest point
- Elevation: 3,550 m (11,650 ft)
- Prominence: 363 m (1,191 ft)
- Parent peak: Hintere Schwärze
- Listing: Alpine mountains above 3000 m
- Coordinates: 46°50′48″N 10°57′32″E

Geography
- Location within Austria
- Location: Tyrol, Austria
- Parent range: Ötztal Alps

Climbing
- First ascent: 16 Jul 1862 by Johann Jakob Weilenmann
- Easiest route: Ostgrat

The Ramolkogel is a mountain in the Schnalskamm group of the Ötztal Alps.
