= Rainer Gögele =

Austrian politician (born 1956)

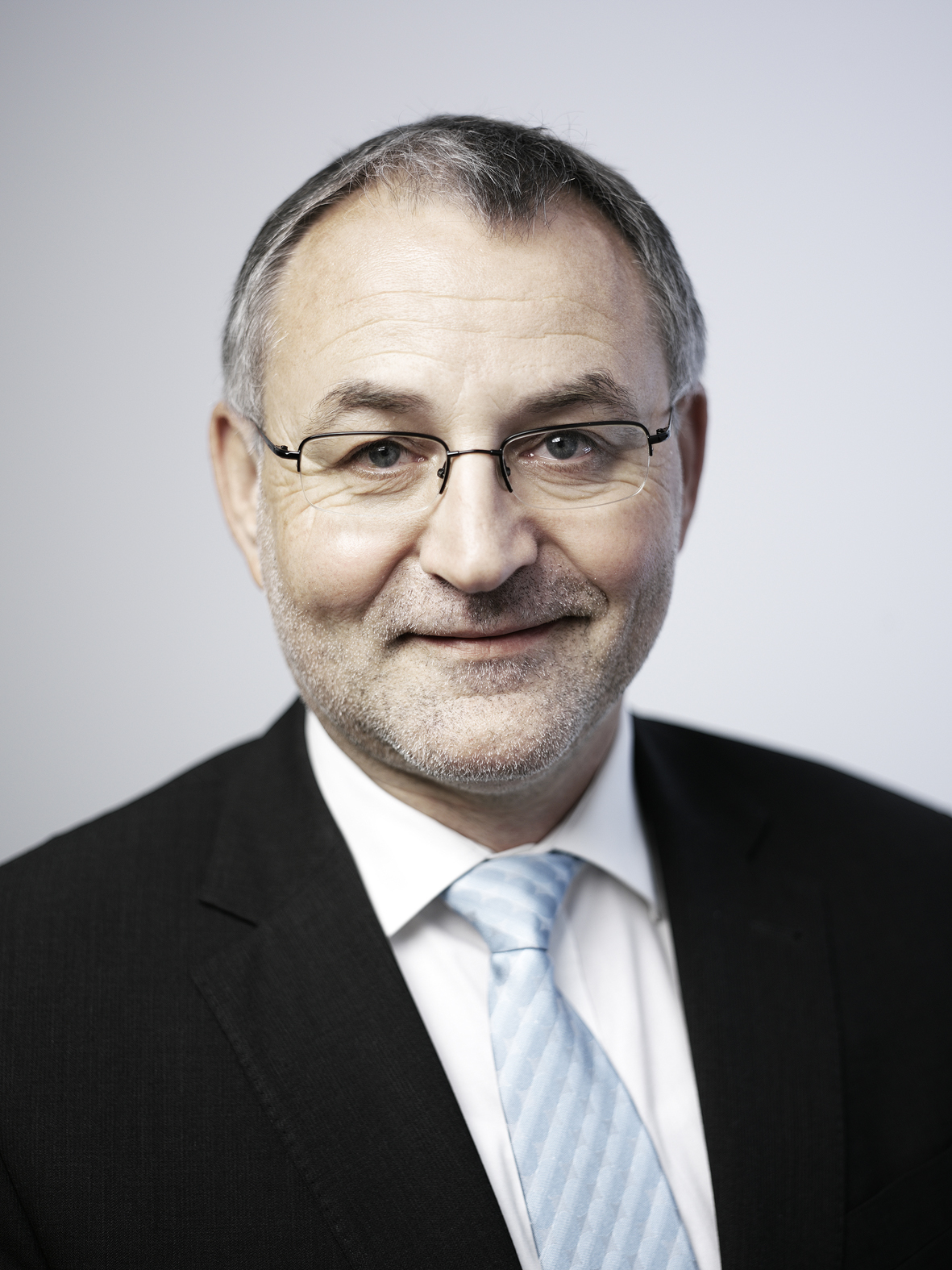
Rainer Gögele (2010)

Rainer Gögele (born 26 July 1956, Feldkirch, Austria) is a former Austrian politician for the Austrian People's Party (ÖVP). He was, from 2011 to 2012, Landesrat in the Provincial Government of Vorarlberg. He was previously, since 2004, deputy of the ÖVP in the State Parliament of Vorarlberg and club chairman of the ÖVP faction in the parliament from 13 December 2006 onwards. Besides his position as Landesrat, he was also chairman of the Austrian Employee Federation (ÖAAB) in Vorarlberg and county party chairman of the ÖVP Vorarlberg in the Feldkirch district.

== Political career ==
Gögele began his political career in 1990 as a member of the municipal council in his hometown of Mäder. He was elected into the municipal council in 1993, and in 1999, was elected mayor.

In 2004, Gögele was elected to the Vorarlberg Landtag in the Vorarlberg state elections of 2004. Gögele was the spokesman for the regional planning committee, as well as the deputy chairman of the state parliamentary committee of culture, as well as a member of the Legal Affairs Committee, the Social Policy Committee, the Environment Committee and the People's Committee and the substitute member of the Energy Policy Committee, the Finance Committee, the Sports Committee and the Economic Committee. After resigning due to illness, in the governance of Landesstatthalter Hans-Peter Bischof and Markus Wallner in the state government, Gögele was, on 13 December 2006, his successor as club chairman of the ÖVP faction in the parliament.

After governor of Vorarlberg Herbert Sausgruber had resigned in autumn 2011 and Wallner, the former state governor, was elected his successor, Gögele moved up in the office of Landesrats of Health and Building on 7 December 2011. His successor as club chairman of the ÖVP is Roland Frühstück, to the vacant seat in Parliament for Alexander Muxel.

On 1 June 2012, Rainer Gögele announced his immediate resignation as a provincial councilor, ÖAAB chairman and district spokesman in the Feldkirch district for personal reasons. His successor as Health Provincial minister occurred on 6 June, with the former provincial health director Christian Bernhard succeeding him.

== Education and civil life ==
Gögele studied to become a teacher in Latin and religion with a Magister degree, but acquired a doctorate, and due to its pragmatism, he has also acquired the title of professor. Gögele was, until his election to the club chairman, a secondary school teacher for Latin, and previously for Catholic religion at a school in Feldkirch. He was not allowed to teach the latter because of an internal regulation of the Diocese of Feldkirch, since he was a deputy of the Landtag. Following his election as chairman of the ÖVP Club in parliament, he gave up his teaching profession for lack of time. After leaving politics, he took the job as a teacher of Latin and religion again at BORG Dornbirn-Schoren.

== Personal life ==
Rainer Gögele is married, has two children and lives in Mäder.
