= Schifter =

Schifter is a surname. Notable people with the surname include:

- Andreas Schifter (1779–1852), Danish naval officer, shipbuilder, naval administrator, and admiral
- Günther Schifter (1923–2008), Austrian journalist, radio presenter, and record collector
- Richard Schifter (1923–2020), Austrian-American attorney and diplomat
