= Muxel =

Muxel is a German surname. Notable people with the surname include:

- Alexander Muxel (born 1969), Austrian business manager and former politician
- Anne Muxel (born 1956), French sociologist and political scientist
- Kathleen Muxel (1971–2026), German politician
