= 2006 in Austria =

- Decades: 1980s; 1990s; 2000s; 2010s; 2020s
- See also: Other events of 2006; List of years in Austria

Events from the year 2006 in Austria

== Incumbents ==
- President: Heinz Fischer
- Chancellor: Wolfgang Schüssel

=== Governors ===
- Burgenland: Hans Niessl
- Carinthia: Jörg Haider
- Lower Austria: Erwin Pröll
- Salzburg: Gabi Burgstaller
- Styria: Franz Voves
- Tyrol: Herwig van Staa
- Upper Austria: Josef Pühringer
- Vienna: Michael Häupl
- Vorarlberg: Herbert Sausgruber

== Events ==
=== October ===
- October 1 – 2006 Austrian legislative election

== Deaths ==
1. Heinrich Harrer, 93, Explorer of Tibet, Dies, New York Times, January 10, 2006.
- – Gernot Jurtin, Austrian footballer
- – Heinrich Harrer, Austrian mountaineer and author
- – György Ligeti, Hungarian-Austrian composer
- – Wolfgang Přiklopi, Austrian communications technician
1. Sturm's Jurtin mourned in Austria, UEFA, December 6, 2006.
