= Manfred Angerer =

Austrian musicologist

Manfred Angerer (15 October 1953 – 19 April 2010) was an Austrian musicologist.

== Life ==
Born in Pöchlarn (Lower Austria), Angerer studied piano as a concert subject at the Vienna Academy of Music from 1970 and musicology as well as art history and philosophy at the University of Vienna from 1972. He completed his doctorate in 1979 with a dissertation on Alexander Scriabin's late works. Two years later he became assistant to Walter Pass at the Institute for Musicology of the University of Vienna, becoming a lecturer in 1984. In 1990 he habilitated with a thesis on Joseph Haydn. Angerer was married to the musicologist Eike Rathgeber (b. 1965).

Angere died In Vienna at age 56.

== Awards ==
- 1991 Wissenschaftspreis des Landes Niederösterreic advancement Award

== Publications ==
- Manfred Angerer: Musikalischer Ästhetizismus. Analytische Studien zu Skrjabins Spätwerk(Wiener Veröffentlichungen zur Musikwissenschaft, 23), Hans Schneider, Tutzing 1984. 124 p. Notenbeisp. ISBN 3-7952-0412-7
- Manfred Angerer (ed.): Festschrift Othmar Wessely zum 60. Geburtstag. Schneider, Tutzing 1982.
- Manfred Angerer: Musik in Österreich, eine Chronik in Daten, Dokumenten, Essays und Bildern; klassische Musik, Oper, Operette, Volksmusik, Unterhaltungsmusik, Avantgardemusik, Komponisten, Dirigenten, Virtuosen, Sänger, Musikstätten, Festspiele, Instrumentenbau. Gottfried Kraus (ed.); Vienne 1989.
- Musik-Wissenschaft an ihren Grenzen. Manfred Angerer zum 50. Geburtstag. Dominik Schweiger, Michael Staudinger, Nikolaus Urbanek (ed.); Lang, Frankfurt, Vienna among others. 2004. ISBN 3-631-51955-9
- Kürzen. Gedenkschrift für Manfred Angerer. Wolfgang Fuhrmann, Ioana Geanta, Markus Grassl, Dominik Šedivý (ed.); Präsens, Vienna 2016. ISBN 978-3706908573
