= Spiegelkogel =

Mountain in the Ötztal Alps

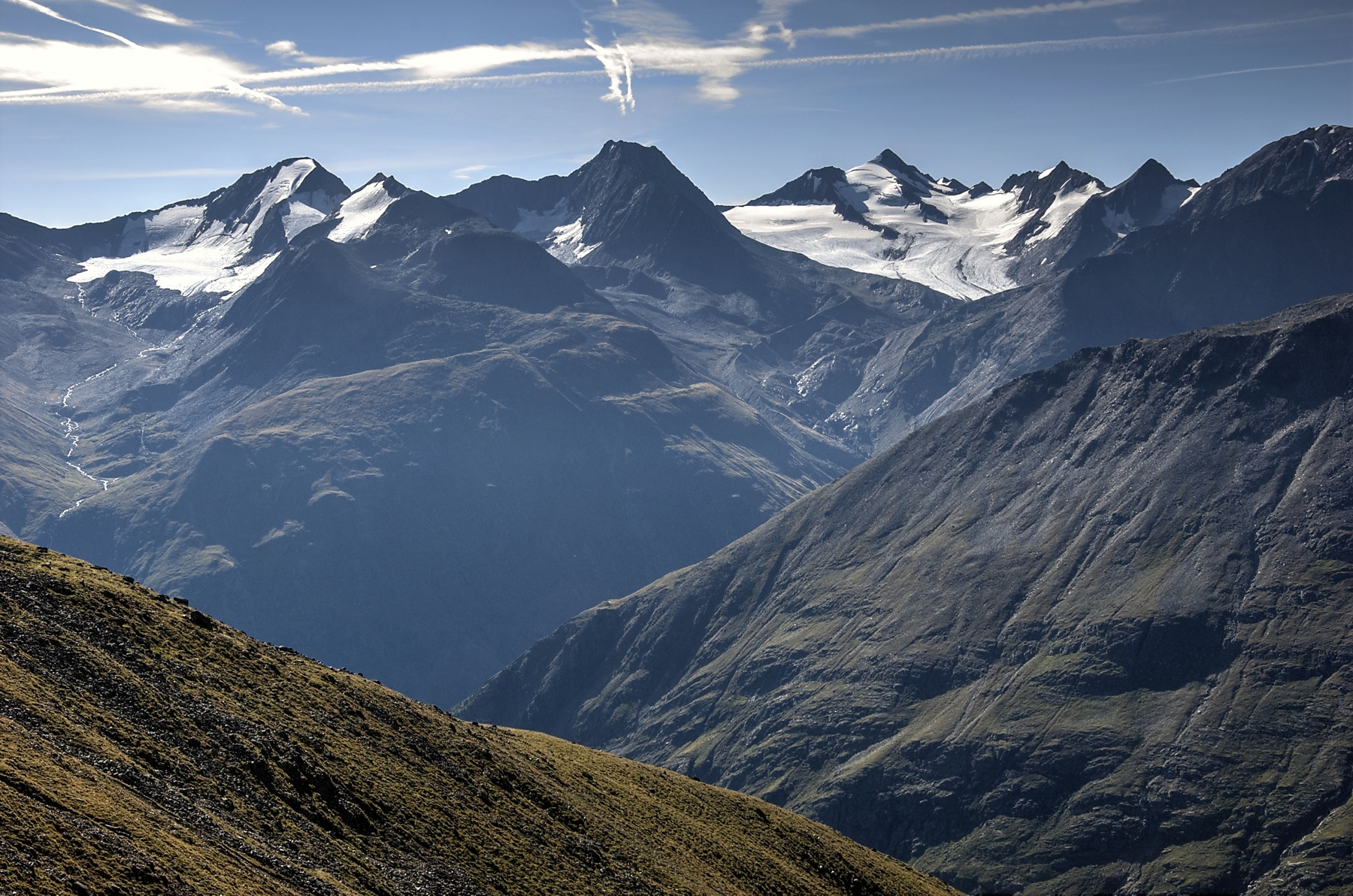
- A view from across the upper Ötz valley on Spiegelkogel (3426 m), Firmisanschneide (3491 m), and Schalfkogel (3540 m).

Highest point
- Elevation: 3,426 m (11,240 ft)
- Prominence: 181 m (594 ft)
- Parent peak: Firmisanschneide
- Coordinates: 46°49′45″N 10°57′32″E

Geography
- Location within Austria
- Location: Tyrol, Austria
- Parent range: Ötztal Alps

Climbing
- First ascent: 1870 by Franz Senn, V. von Mayrl, J. Schöpf (guide), and J. Gstrein (guide)
- Easiest route: From the Ramolhaus via the Spiegeljoch over the south ridge

The Spiegelkogel is a mountain in the Schnalskamm group of the Ötztal Alps.

== Climbing route ==
Spiegelkogel can be climbed from the towns of Vent and from Obergurgl in the upper Ötztal. You do not need any special equipment to climb it, but there are exposed sections on the summit ridge. The approach from Vent was taken by the first ascendants but is now uncommon. The approach from Obergurgl is via the Ramolhaus mountain hostel at 3006 m altitude. Plan 5 hours from the village to the summit and 3 hours from the hut.
