= Wolfgang Blenk =

Austrian politician (1926–1996)

- Born: July 28, 1926; Dornbirn
- Died: July 20, 1996; Dornbirn
- Occupation: politician

Wolfgang Blenk (28 July 1926, Dornbirn, Austria – 20 July 1996, Dornbirn) was an Austrian politician for the Austrian People's Party (ÖVP) in Vorarlberg. He was, from 1970 to 1990, was a member of the National Council of Austria for the ÖVP.

== Political Work ==
On April 4, 1943, Blenk asked to join the Nazi Party. He was admitted six days later with membership no. 9,850,951. After attending grammar school in his hometown of Dornbirn, Blenk studied jurisprudence at the University of Innsbruck, where he received his doctorate in 1949. Blenk was a member of the KMV Siegberg Dornbirn, Cartellverband, and the AV Austria Innsbruck.

He then was the successive director of legal policy department of the Chamber of Commerce of Vorarlberg, an Austrian trade delegate in Rome and Istanbul, Head of the Foreign Trade Unit of Southern Europe in the Federal Economic Chamber, Section Manager of Industry Chamber of Commerce Vorarlberg and head of the economics department of the Vorarlberg Chamber of Commerce.

From 1966 onward, Blenk was a member of the city council in his hometown, which he remained until 1970. By 1976, he was a member of the Parliamentary Assembly of the Council of Europe, where he was chairman of the 1981 European People's Party Group.

Blenk was appointed as a national councilman on 31 March 1970 for more than 20 years for six legislative periods. It was not until 4 November 1990 that Blenk left the parliament and retired. He died on 20 July 1996 in Dornbirn.

His daughter, Andrea Kaufmann (née Blenk), is the current mayor of Dornbirn.

== Awards ==
- 1978: Großes Goldenes Ehrenzeichen für Verdienste um die Republik Österreich
