= Alexander Rausch =

Austrian musicologist

Alexander Rausch (born in 1971) is an Austrian musicologist.

== Life ==
Born in Vienna, Rausch studied musicology and Romanistic at the University of Vienna from 1989 to 1996. In 1994 he completed an Erasmus Programme semester abroad at the Bavarian Academy of Sciences in Munich. From 1995 to 2000 he was active in two Austrian Science Fund projects on the music theoretical sources of the Middle Ages in Austria. In 1997 he was awarded a doctorate by Walter Pass at the University of Vienna with a thesis on "The musical treatises of the abbot Berno of Reichenau".

Since 2003 he has been working at the Department of Musicology of the Institute for Art and Music Historical Research of the Austrian Academy of Sciences in Vienna. From 2003 to 2006 he contributed to the Oesterreichisches Musiklexikon. From 2007 to 2015 he was involved in the project "Music - Identity - Space". From 2008 to 2015 he was the scientific director of two FWF projects on medieval music manuscripts at the Austrian National Library in Vienna. In 2015 he took over the leadership of the ÖAW working group "Complete editions, editions and source documentation".

His main research interests are medieval music, the early modern period musical representation and the composer and music theorist Johann Joseph Fux. Rausch is a member of the Gesellschaft für Musikforschung, the Österreichische Gesellschaft für Musikwissenschaft, the Anton Bruckner Institut Linz, der Internationale Gustav Mahler Gesellschaft and the Gesellschaft für Bayerische Musikgeschichte.

== Publications ==
- Opusculum de musica ex traditione Iohannis Hollandrini. Institute Of Mediaeval Music, Ottawa 1997, ISBN 1-896926-00-2 (Musical Theorists in Translation. Vol. 15).
- Die Musiktraktate des Abtes Bern von Reichenau: Edition und Interpretation. Schneider, Tutzing 1999, ISBN 3-7952-0989-7 (Musica mediaevalis Europae occidentalis. Vol. 5).
- Das spätmittelalterliche Choraltraktat aus der Kartause Gaming (Niederösterreich): Einführung und Edition. Schneider, Tutzing 2008, ISBN 978-3-7952-1258-2 (Musica mediaevalis Europae occidentalis. Vol. 9).
- Collaboration: Robert Klugseder: Ausgewählte mittelalterliche Musikfragmente der Österreichischen Nationalbibliothek Wien. Hollinek, Purkersdorf 2011 (Codices manuscripti. Supplementum 5)
- Edited with Björn R. Tammen: Musikalische Repertoires in Zentraleuropa (1420–1450): Prozesse & Praktiken. Böhlau, Vienna among others, 2014, ISBN 978-3-205-79562-9 (Wiener musikwissenschaftliche Beiträge. vol. 26).
- Giunone placata Fux WV II.2.19 (K 316): Johann Joseph Fux – Dramatische Werke. Published by the Institut für kunst- und musikhistorische Forschungen an der ÖAW, Hollitzer Wissenschaftsverlag, Vienna 2018, ISBN 978-3-99012-474-1.
