= 2009 Vorarlberg state election =

← 2004	20 September 2009	2014 →

All 36 seats in the Landtag of Vorarlberg 19 seats needed for a majority
- Turnout: 178,711 (68.4%) ▲7.8%
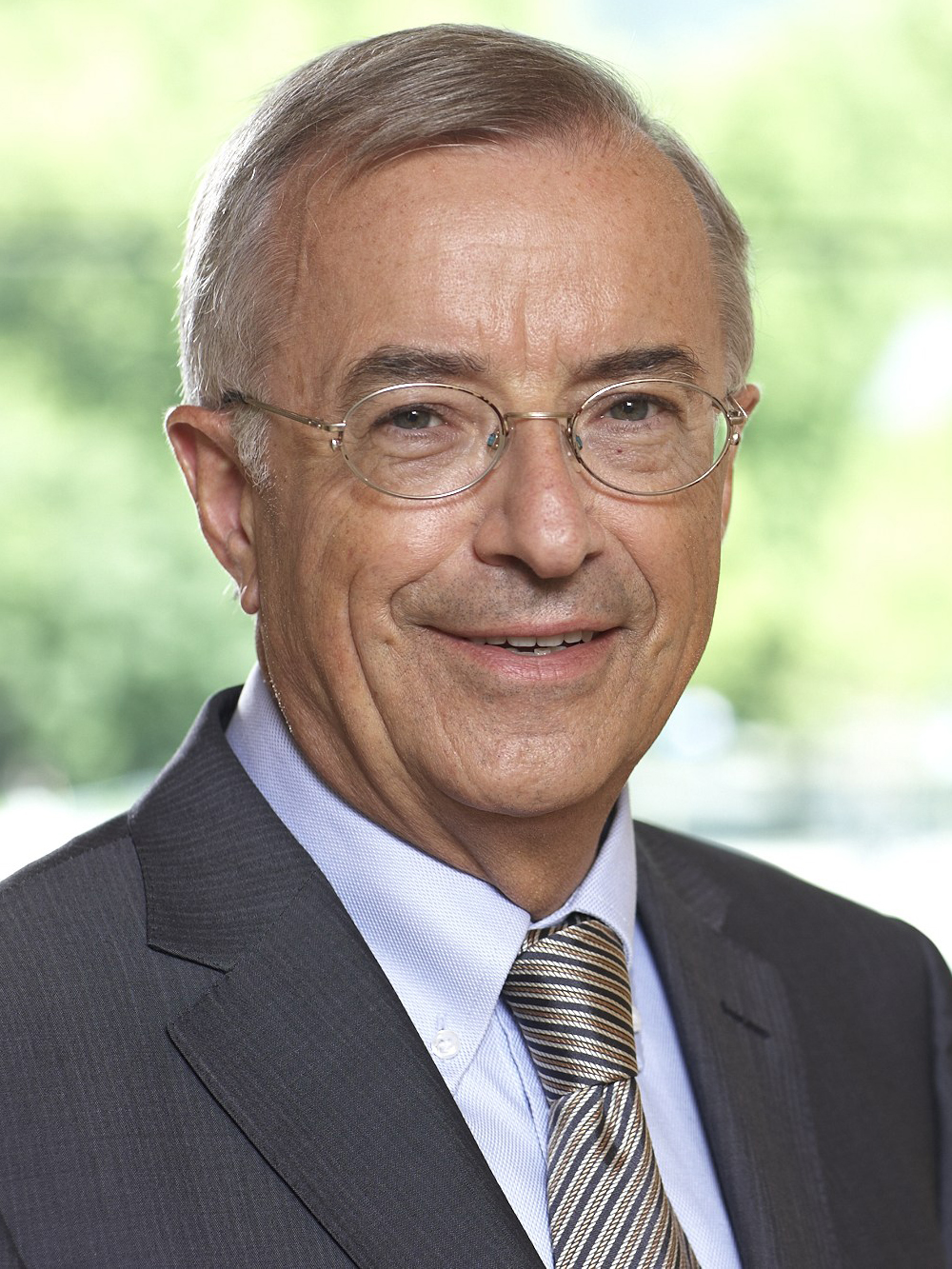

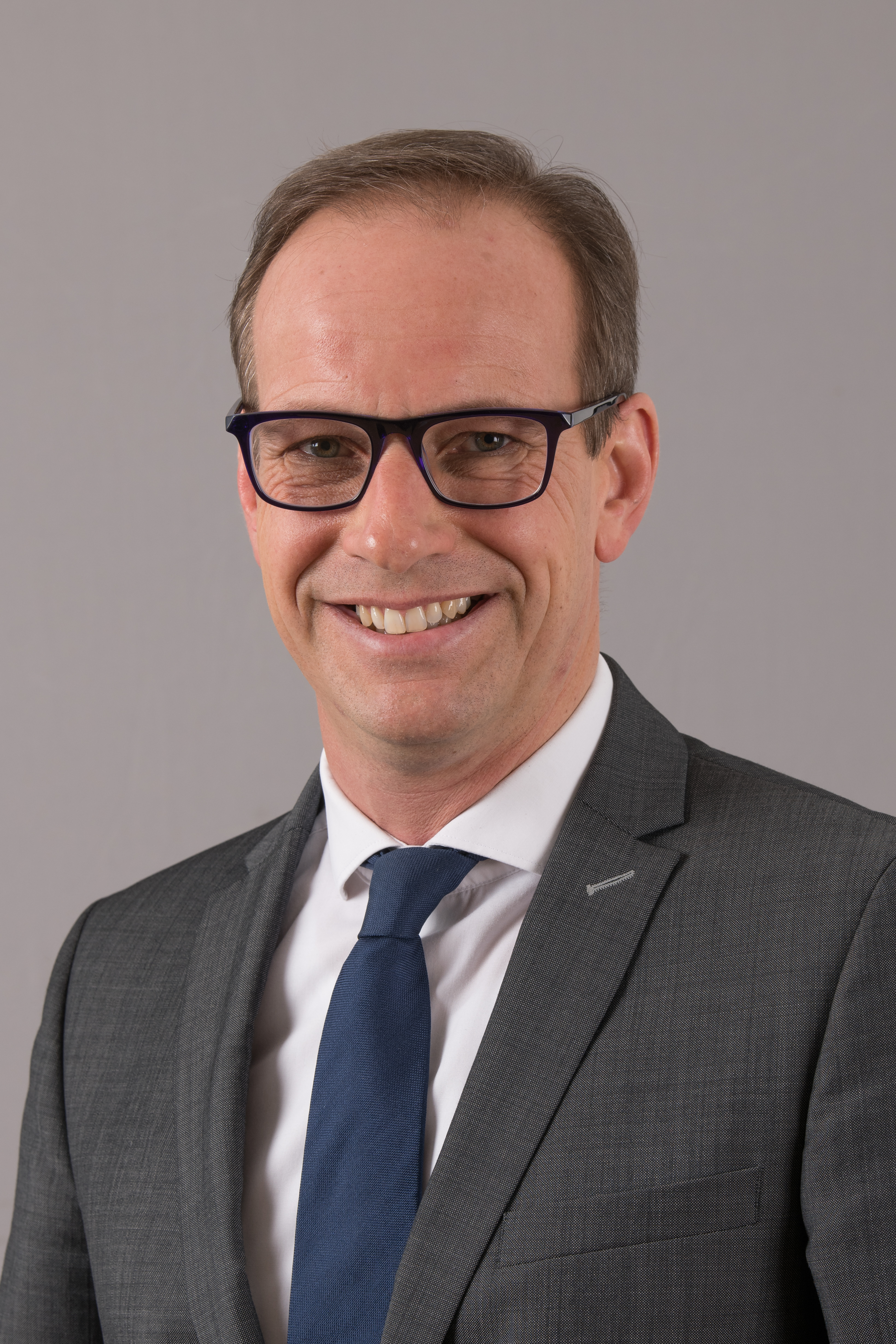

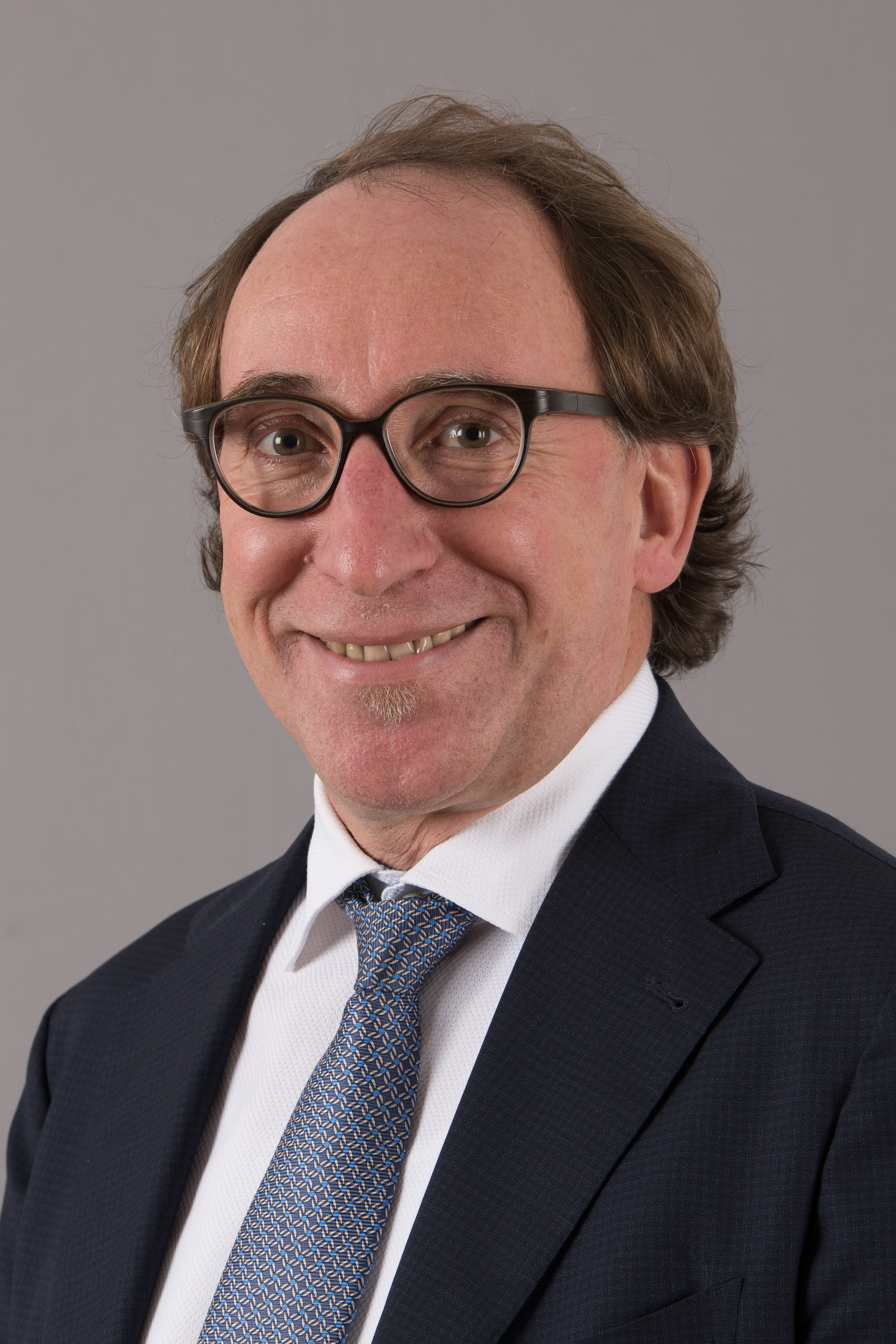

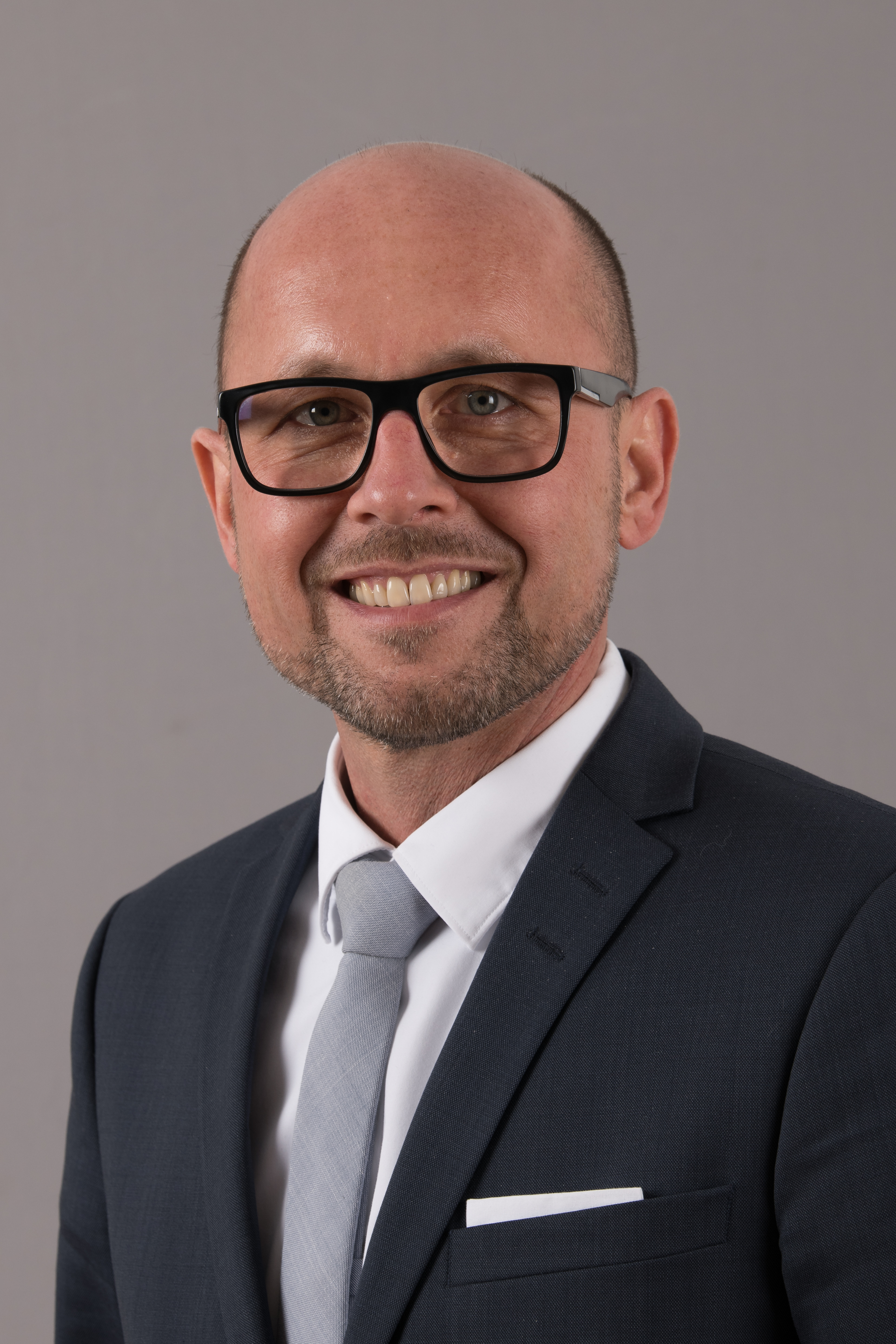
	First party	Second party
Leader	Herbert Sausgruber	Dieter Egger
Party	ÖVP	FPÖ
Last election	21 seats, 54.9%	5 seats, 12.9%
Seats won	20	9
Seat change	▼1	▲4
Popular vote	90,108	44,562
Percentage	50.8%	25.1%
Swing	▼4.1%	▲12.2%
	Third party	Fourth party
Leader	Johannes Rauch	Michael Ritsch
Party	Greens	SPÖ
Last election	4 seats, 10.2%	6 seats, 16.9%
Seats won	4	3
Seat change	0	▼3
Popular vote	18,763	17,779
Percentage	10.6%	10.0%
Swing	▲0.4%	▼6.9%
- ÖVP results by municipality. Darker shades indicate a stronger vote share.
Governor before election
Herbert Sausgruber
ÖVP
Elected Governor
Herbert Sausgruber
ÖVP

The 2009 Vorarlberg state election was held on 20 September 2009 to elect the members of the Landtag of Vorarlberg.

The governing Austrian People's Party (ÖVP) retained their majority with losses, while the Freedom Party of Austria (FPÖ) recovered nearly all the losses it had suffered in 2004. The Social Democratic Party of Austria (SPÖ) lost much of their support and fell to fourth place behind The Greens, who stayed essentially level with the strong result they achieved in 2004. Governor Herbert Sausgruber was re-elected by the Landtag.

== Background ==
In the 2004 election, the ÖVP achieved a strong result which allowed them to regain a comfortable majority. This was matched by major losses for the FPÖ, who fell from second to third place. Both the SPÖ and Greens also benefited. In addition, turnout fell catastrophically from 88% to just 60%.

== Electoral system ==
The 36 seats of the Landtag of Vorarlberg are elected via open list proportional representation in a two-step process. The seats are distributed between four multi-member constituencies, corresponding to the districts of Vorarlberg. For parties to receive any representation in the Landtag, they must either win at least one seat in a constituency directly, or clear a 5 percent state-wide electoral threshold. Seats are distributed in constituencies according to the Hagenbach-Bischoff quota, with any remaining seats allocated at the state level, to ensure overall proportionality between a party's vote share and its share of seats.

== Contesting parties ==
The table below lists parties represented in the previous Landtag.

Name		Ideology	Leader	2004 result	
Name		Ideology	Leader	Votes (%)	Seats
ÖVP	Austrian People's Party; Österreichische Volkspartei	Christian democracy	Herbert Sausgruber	54.9%	21 / 36
SPÖ	Social Democratic Party of Austria; Sozialdemokratische Partei Österreichs	Social democracy	Michael Ritsch	16.9%	6 / 36
FPÖ	Freedom Party of Austria; Freiheitliche Partei Österreichs	Right-wing populism Euroscepticism	Dieter Egger	12.9%	5 / 36
GRÜNE	The Greens – The Green Alternative; Die Grünen – Die Grüne Alternative	Green politics	Johannes Rauch	10.2%	4 / 36

In addition to the parties already represented in the Landtag, four parties collected enough signatures to be placed on the ballot.

- The Gsiberger (GSI)
- Alliance for the Future of Austria (BZÖ)
- wir-gemeinsam.at (WIR)
- Kiebitz

== Result ==
Party	Votes	%	+/−	Seats	+/−
Austrian People's Party (ÖVP)	90,108	50.79	–4.13	20	–1
Freedom Party of Austria (FPÖ)	44,562	25.12	+12.18	9	+4
The Greens – The Green Alternative (GRÜNE)	18,763	10.58	+0.41	4	±0
Social Democratic Party of Austria (SPÖ)	17,779	10.02	–6.85	3	–3
The Gsiberger (GSI)	3,090	1.74	New	0	New
Alliance for the Future of Austria (BZÖ)	2,134	1.20	New	0	New
wir-gemeinsam.at (WIR)	647	0.36	New	0	New
Kiebitz	331	0.19	New	0	New
Invalid/blank votes	1,297	–	–	–	–
Total	178,711	100	–	36	0
Registered voters/turnout	261,132	68.44	+7.80	–	–
Source: Vorarlberg Government

Popular vote
ÖVP	50.79%
FPÖ	25.12%
GRÜNE	10.58%
SPÖ	10.02%
Other	3.49%

Landtag seats
ÖVP	55.56%
FPÖ	25.00%
GRÜNE	11.11%
SPÖ	8.33%

=== Results by constituency ===
Constituency	ÖVP	FPÖ	Grüne	SPÖ	Others
Constituency	%	%	%	%	%
Bludenz	52.0	25.6	7.2	12.1	3.1
Bregenz	54.6	22.6	9.8	9.7	3.3
Dornbirn	45.1	29.2	11.7	9.8	4.2
Feldkirch	49.6	24.8	12.9	9.2	3.5
Total	50.8	25.1	10.6	10.0	3.5
Source: Vorarlberg Government
