= Frédéric Bourgeois de Mercey =

French painter (1803–1860)

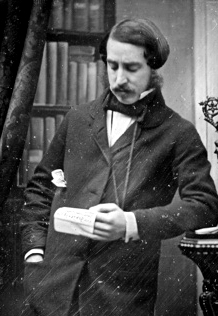
Frédéric Bourgeois de Mercey, by Jean-Baptiste Louis Gros (c. 1856)

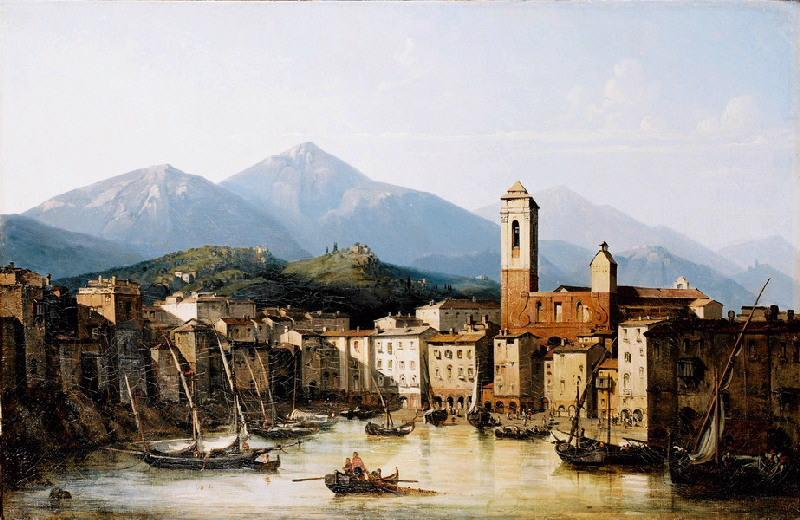
View of the Old Port of Bastia

Frédéric Bourgeois de Mercey (20 May 1803, Paris – 6 September 1860, La Faloise) was a French painter, art critic, travel writer, and novelist.

== Biography ==
His father was Louis-Frédéric Bourgeois de Mercey, a property manager, originally from Lorraine. He was interested in landscape art; travelling throughout northwestern Europe from 1828 and becoming the first person to climb the Schalfkogel in 1830. During his travels, he created albums of sketches, and many of the paintings that resulted were purchased by the nobility.

From 1831, he was a regular exhibitor of landscapes at the Salon, where he received a second-class medal in 1838. That same year, he married Anna Morgan, with whom he had two sons. In the late 1840s, a progressive eye disease gradually forced him to abandon painting as a regular pursuit. His last, small, exhibition was in 1857.

From 1833 to 1848, he was a contributor to numerous periodicals; including the Revue des deux Mondes, the Revue de Paris (as "Frédéric de la Faloise"), and L'Artiste (as "Le Genevais").

Meanwhile, in 1840, he had joined the Ministry of the Interior. There, he served as head of the Department of Fine Arts. In 1843, he was named a Knight in the Legion of Honor. He transferred to the Ministry of State in 1852, where he held a similar position; head of the Division of Fine Arts.

In 1855, he was the general curator for the French exhibit at the Exposition Universelle, and also served on the jury. He was elected to the Académie des Beaux-Arts in 1859, where he took Seat #9 in the "Unattached" section.
