= 2004 Vorarlberg state election =

Election in Vorarlberg, Austria

← 1999	19 September 2004	2009 →

All 36 seats in the Landtag of Vorarlberg 19 seats needed for a majority
- Turnout: 147,047 (60.6%) ▼27.2%
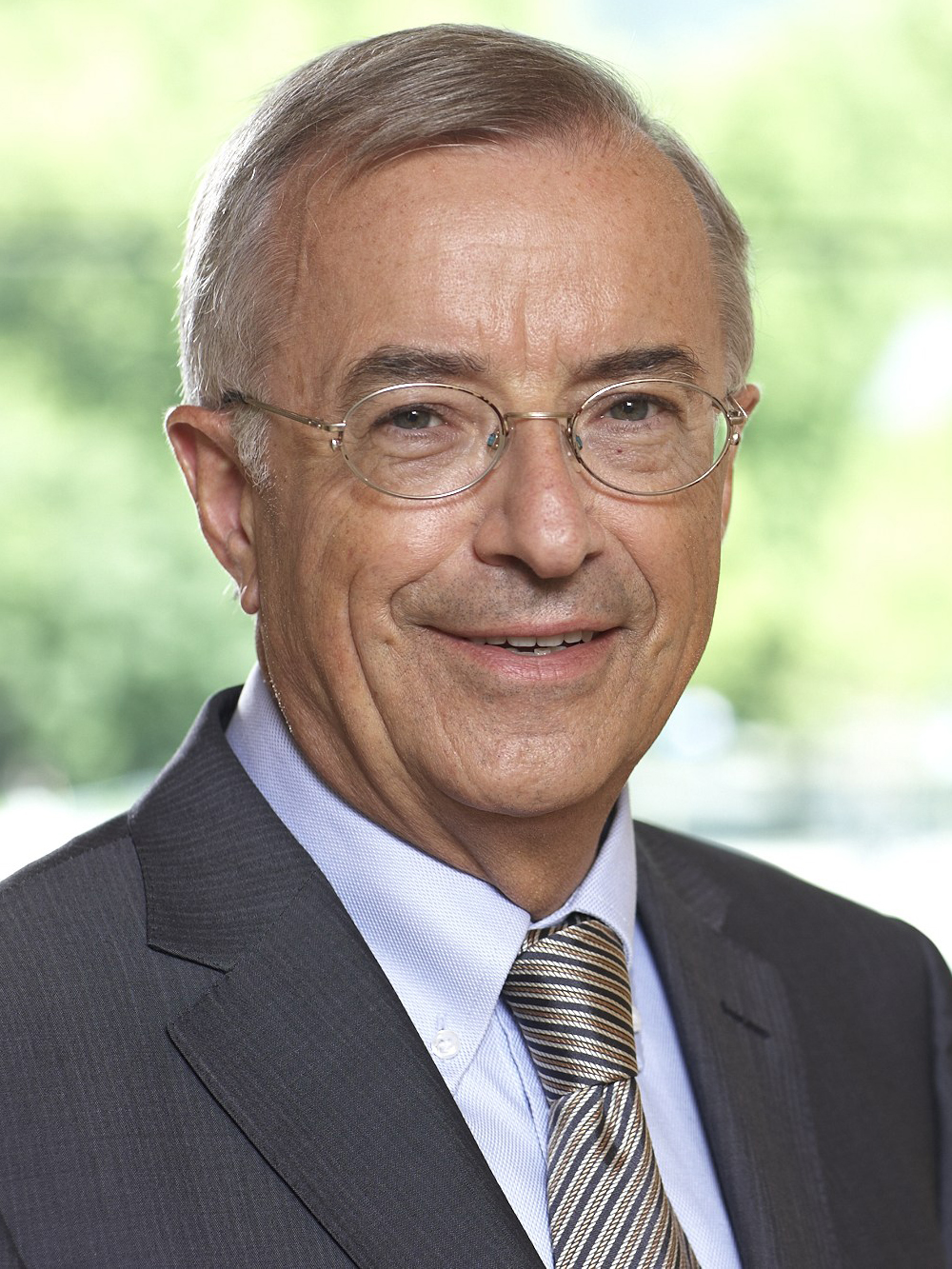

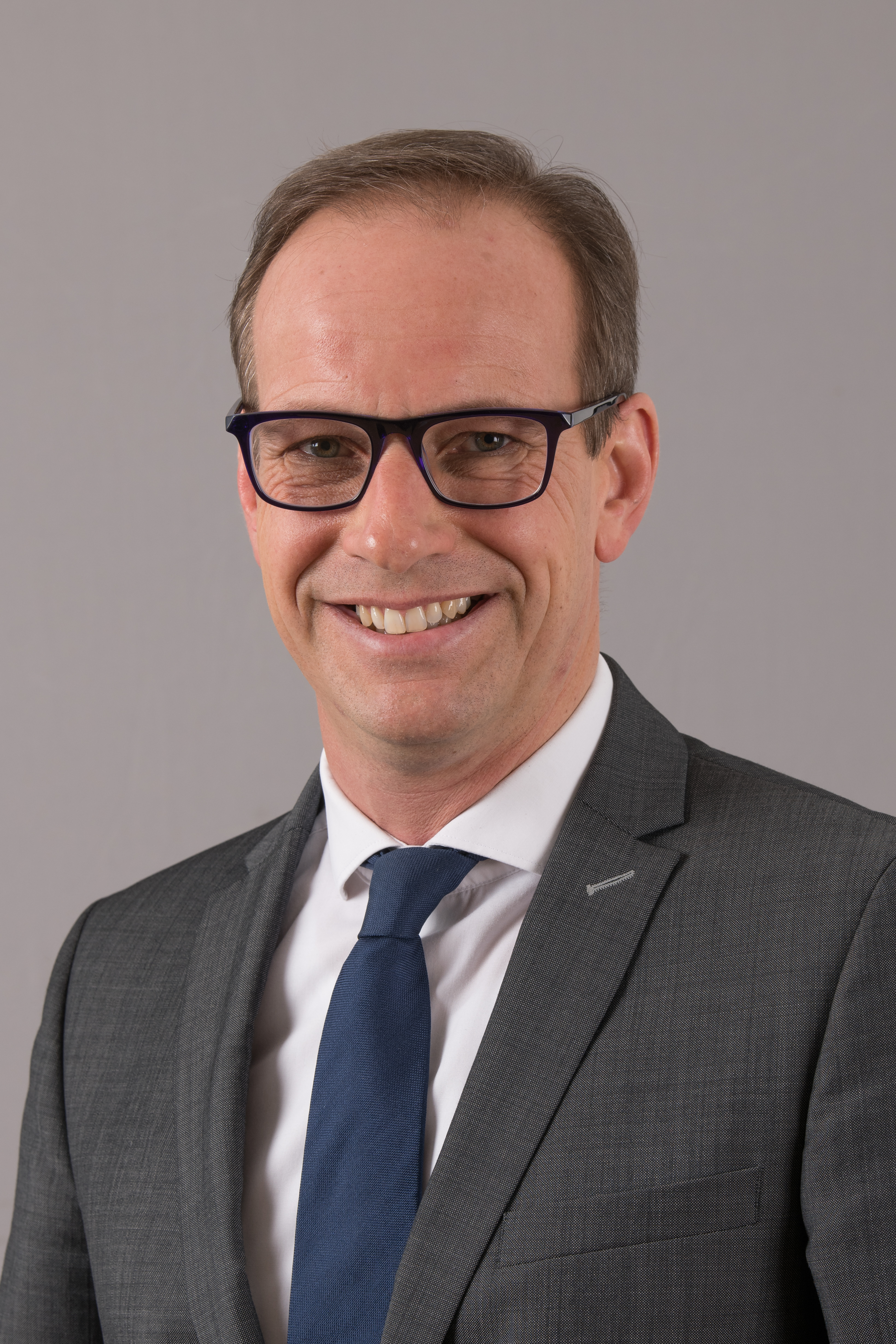

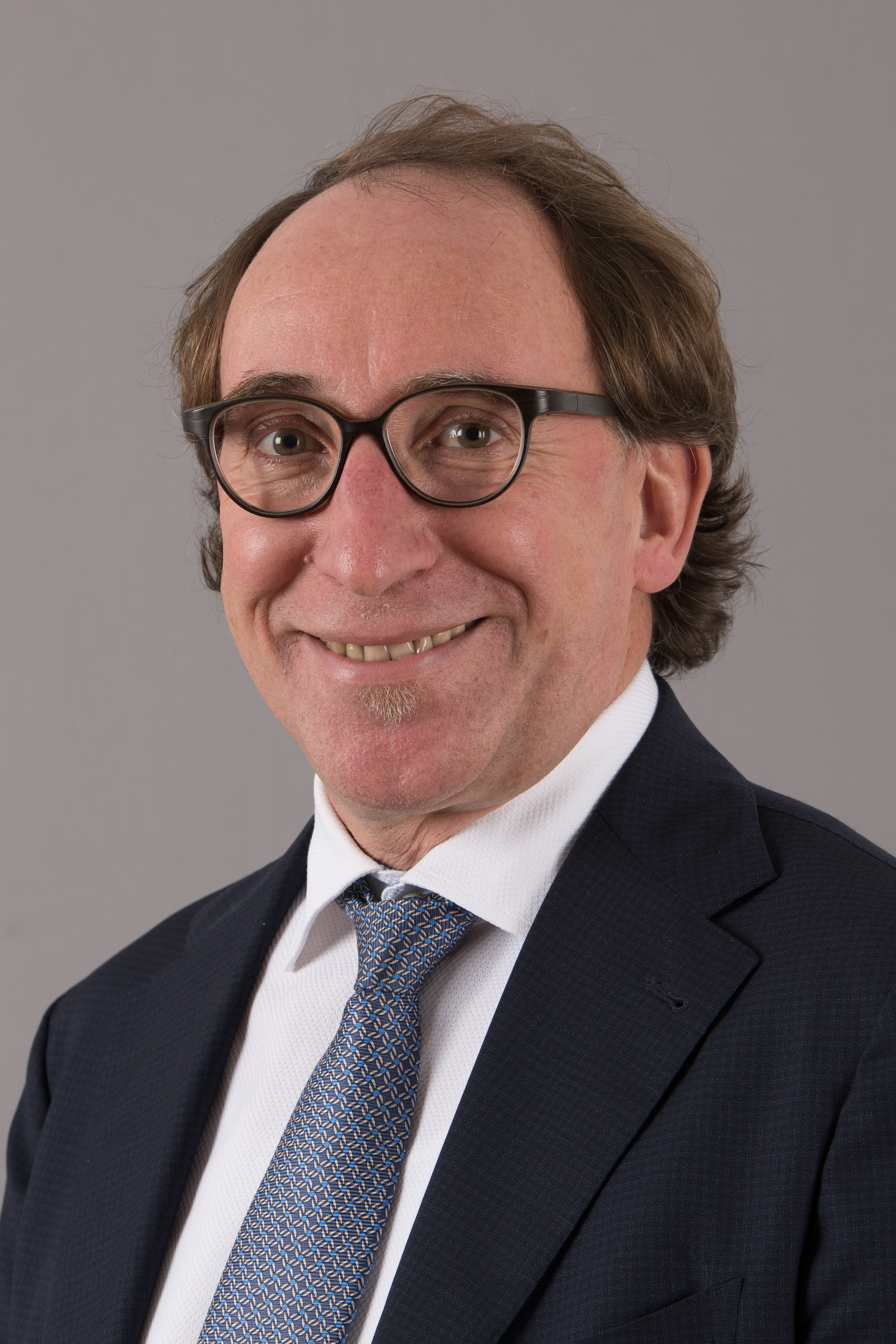
	First party	Second party
Leader	Herbert Sausgruber	Elke Sader
Party	ÖVP	SPÖ
Last election	18 seats, 45.8%	5 seats, 13.0%
Seats won	21	6
Seat change	▲3	▲1
Popular vote	80,112	24,609
Percentage	54.9%	16.9%
Swing	▲9.2%	▲3.9%
	Third party	Fourth party
Leader	Dieter Egger	Johannes Rauch
Party	FPÖ	Greens
Last election	11 seats, 27.4%	2 seats, 6.0%
Seats won	5	4
Seat change	▼6	▲2
Popular vote	18,881	14,829
Percentage	12.9%	10.2%
Swing	▼14.5%	▲4.1%
Governor before election
Herbert Sausgruber
ÖVP
Elected Governor
Herbert Sausgruber
ÖVP

The 2004 Vorarlberg state election was held on 19 September 2004 to elect the members of the Landtag of Vorarlberg in Austria.

The Austrian People's Party (ÖVP) regained the absolute majority it had lost in 1999, achieving a strong swing of 9 percentage points. The Freedom Party of Austria (FPÖ) lost more than half its vote share and seats, falling to third place behind the Social Democratic Party of Austria (SPÖ), which gained four points. The Greens also gained four points and doubled their seat count from two to four.

The repeal of compulsory voting resulted in a huge decline in voter turnout, which fell from 87% to 60%. As a result, only the Greens actually gained votes compared to 1999; the ÖVP lost 7,000 votes, the SPÖ 200, and the FPÖ 33,000. According to voter analysis conducted by the SORA Institute, only 28% of the FPÖ's voters from 1999 voted for the party again in 2004, while more than half did not vote at all.

== Background ==
In the 1999 election, the ÖVP lost its absolute majority for the first time in history. The FPÖ achieved its best ever result, taking support from the ÖVP and SPÖ. The ÖVP subsequently formed a coalition with the FPÖ.

== Electoral system ==
The 36 seats of the Landtag of Vorarlberg are elected via open list proportional representation in a two-step process. The seats are distributed between four multi-member constituencies, corresponding to the districts of Vorarlberg. For parties to receive any representation in the Landtag, they must either win at least one seat in a constituency directly, or clear a 5 percent state-wide electoral threshold. Seats are distributed in constituencies according to the Hagenbach-Bischoff quota, with any remaining seats allocated at the state level, to ensure overall proportionality between a party's vote share and its share of seats.

== Contesting parties ==
The table below lists parties represented in the previous Landtag.

Name		Ideology	Leader	1999 result	
Name		Ideology	Leader	Votes (%)	Seats
ÖVP	Austrian People's Party; Österreichische Volkspartei	Christian democracy	Herbert Sausgruber	45.8%	18 / 36
FPÖ	Freedom Party of Austria; Freiheitliche Partei Österreichs	Right-wing populism Euroscepticism	Dieter Egger	27.4%	11 / 36
SPÖ	Social Democratic Party of Austria; Sozialdemokratische Partei Österreichs	Social democracy	Elke Sader	13.0%	5 / 36
GRÜNE	The Greens – The Green Alternative; Die Grünen – Die Grüne Alternative	Green politics	Johannes Rauch	6.0%	2 / 36

In addition to the parties already represented in the Landtag, four parties collected enough signatures to be placed on the ballot.

- VAU – www.vau-heute.at (VAU)
- List of Free Citizens (LFB)
- List for all Dissatisfied and Self-thinking (FRIZZ)
- DBK – The Buntkarierten (DBK) – on the ballot only in Bludenz, Dornbirn, and Feldkirch

== Result ==
Party	Votes	%	+/−	Seats	+/−
Austrian People's Party (ÖVP)	80,112	54.92	+9.16	21	+3
Social Democratic Party of Austria (SPÖ)	24,609	16.87	+3.88	6	+1
Freedom Party of Austria (FPÖ)	18,881	12.94	–14.47	5	–6
The Greens – The Green Alternative (GRÜNE)	14,829	10.17	+4.14	4	+2
VAU – www.vau-heute.at (VAU)	3,046	2.09	–0.19	0	±0
List for all Dissatisfied and Self-thinking (FRIZZ)	2,806	1.92	+0.70	0	±0
List of Free Citizens (LFB)	1,373	0.94	New	0	New
DBK – The Buntkarierten (DBK)	207	0.14	New	0	New
Invalid/blank votes	1,184	–	–	–	–
Total	147,047	100	–	36	0
Registered voters/turnout	242,509	60.64	–27.17	–	–
Source: Vorarlberg Government

Popular vote
ÖVP	54.92%
SPÖ	16.87%
FPÖ	12.94%
GRÜNE	10.17%
Other	5.10%

Landtag seats
ÖVP	58.33%
SPÖ	16.67%
FPÖ	13.89%
GRÜNE	11.11%

=== Results by constituency ===
Constituency	ÖVP	SPÖ	FPÖ	Grüne	Others
Constituency	%	%	%	%	%
Bludenz	54.8	19.9	13.6	7.7	3.9
Bregenz	58.0	16.2	11.0	9.5	5.3
Dornbirn	51.9	15.8	15.4	10.8	6.0
Feldkirch	53.2	16.5	13.1	12.2	5.0
Total	54.9	16.9	12.9	10.2	5.1
Source: Vorarlberg Government
