= 2009 Schalfkogel avalanche =

Natural disaster in Austria

Coordinates: 46°58′N 11°00′E

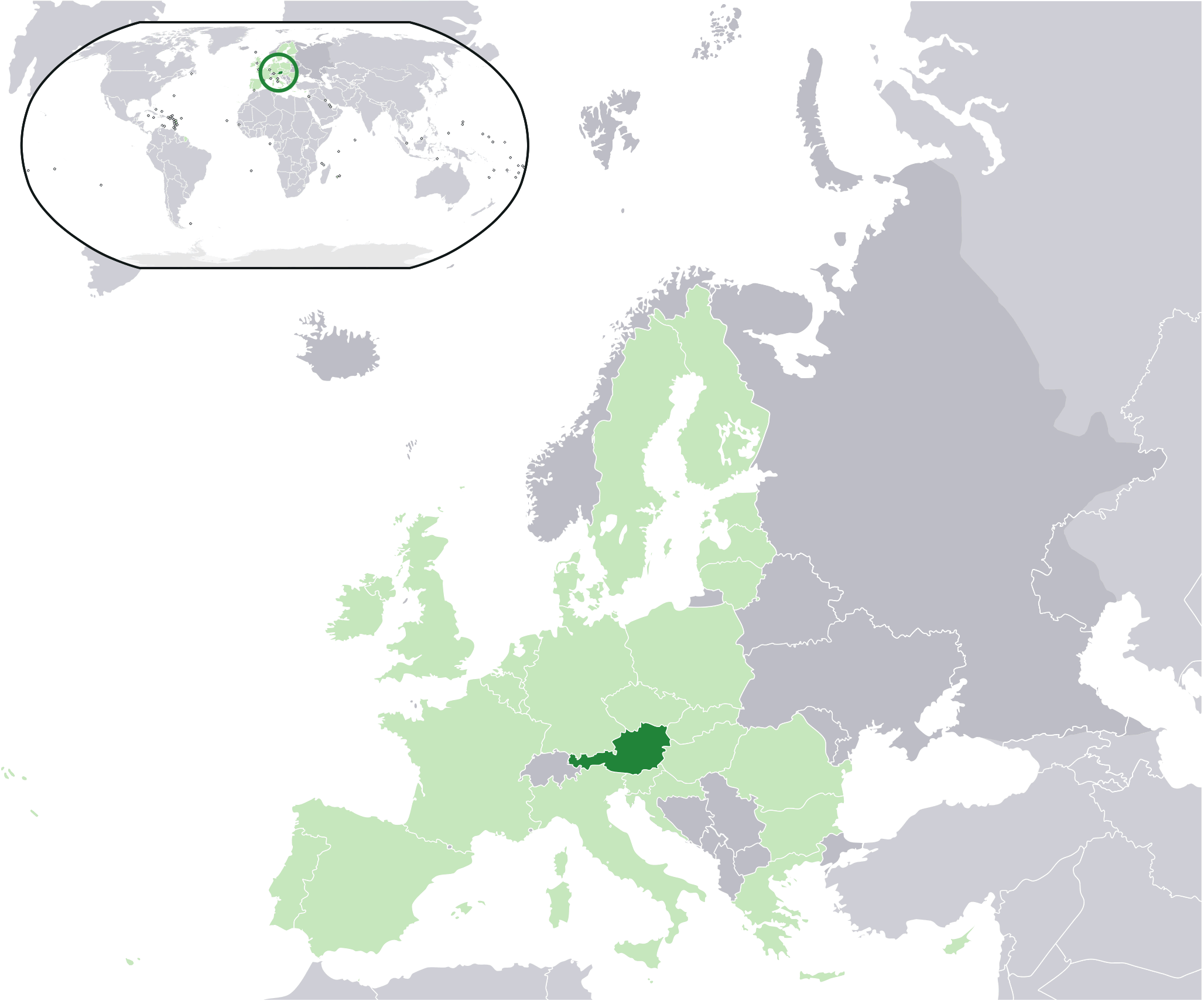
Austria within Europe

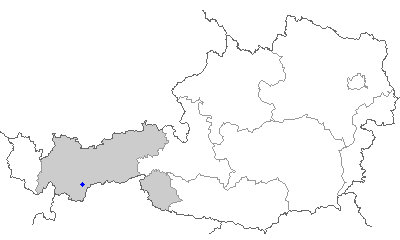
The avalanche occurred in Sölden.

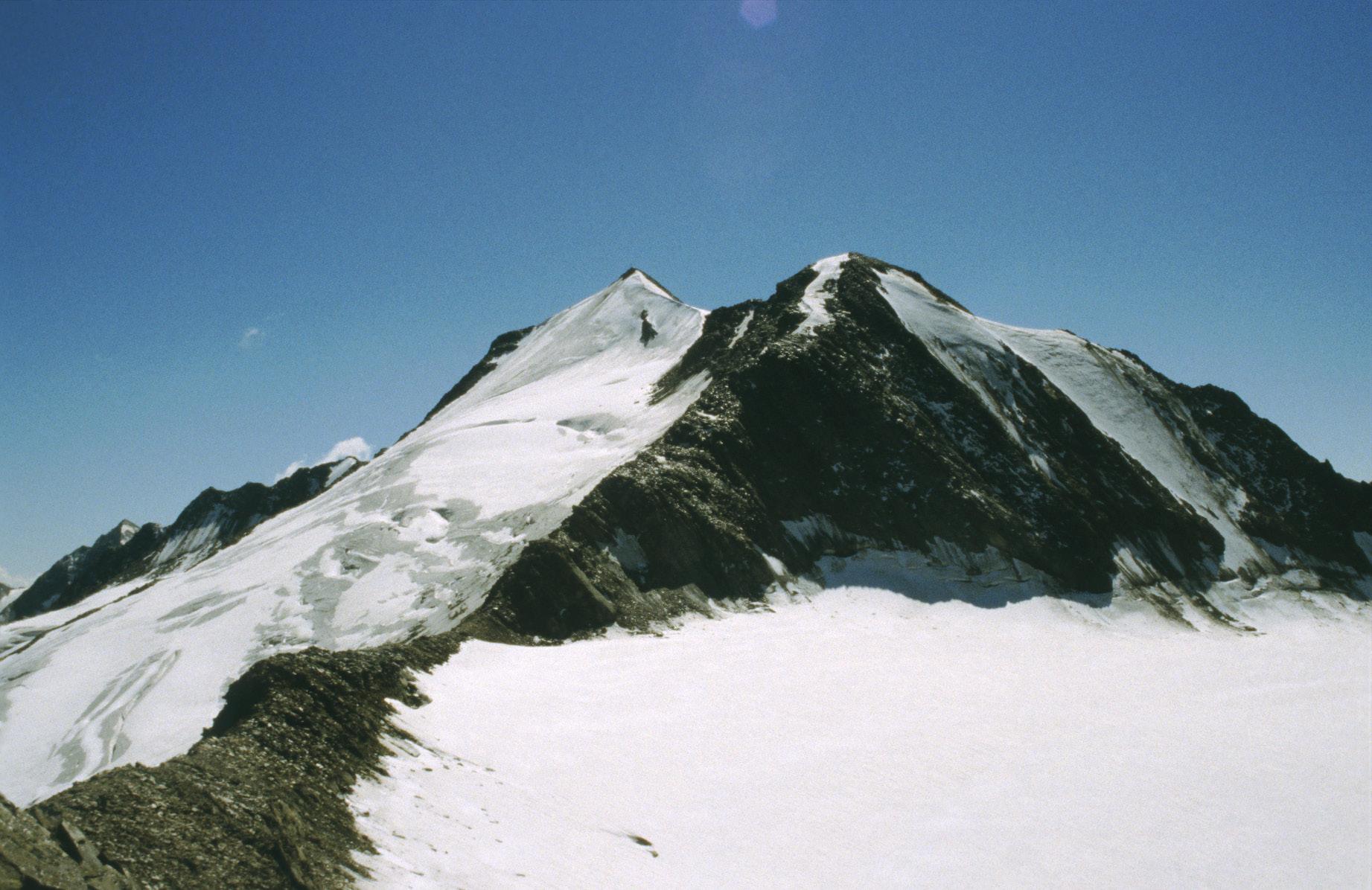
Schalfkogel as seen from the north from the Firmisan pass

The 2009 Schalfkogel avalanche was an avalanche which occurred in Sölden, Austria, on 2 May 2009. Six people were killed, five Czechs and one Slovak, when the disaster struck in the 3,500-metre (11,500 ft) Schalfkogel mountain range. The corpses were discovered to have been frozen upon recovery. It was the deadliest avalanche to have occurred in Austria since March 2000. Although avalanches are a regular occurrence in the region, they mainly kill individuals as opposed to entire groups.

== Incident ==
The victims were hiking when they were buried under two and half metres of snow which fell on them. The avalanche occurred on 2 May at the Sölden ski resort. The hikers were approximately 1,600 feet (490 m) below the summit. Authorities said the six bodies were retrieved as they ascended Schalfkogel between the ski resorts of Sölden and Obergurgl near the Italian border. A rescue effort had gotten underway on 2 May but was suspended that night. The search had earlier been called off. Rescuers were hampered by severe weather conditions. Witnesses had seen the avalanche and reported it by 16:15 but rescuers were delayed by the snowstorm. As soon as the rescue helicopter was able to land all of the victims had been located within the hour. It is understood four of them quickly died and froze after being buried under the snow, whilst the other two had some oxygen and survived in an unfrozen state until this became impossible. Rescuers said these two might have been rescued.

== Survivor ==
One forty-five-year-old man survived. He was a friend of the victims. He had stayed behind in a mountain hut whilst the others continued on their journey. The bodies were identified by this survivor.

== Reaction ==
The mayor of Sölden, Ernst Schöpf, said: "It [was] clear that conditions were not right for a high-altitude tour on Saturday."
