= 2007 Burgenland local elections =

Local elections in Austria

Local and mayoral elections were held in the Austrian state of Burgenland on 7 October 2007. The date was decided on by Franz Steindl (ÖVP), who is responsible for elections as the deputy governor of Burgenland. The elections were held in only 170 of the 171 municipalities of Burgenland because Steinberg-Dörfl had held early elections in 2006.

Apart from the SPÖ, the ÖVP, the Greens and the FPÖ, the former leader of the Freedom Party in Burgenland, Wolfgang Rauter, will stand with a split from the FPÖ, the Free Citizens' List (German: Plattform Freie Bürgerlisten, FBL), instead. The FPÖ's goal for the election initially were 70 local councillors or more (this goal was later raised to "90 or more"), while the SPÖ wants to improve on its "record achievement" of 94 mayors in the 2002 elections. The BZÖ did not contest this election.

Participation was 82.93%, a slight decrease, and results were:

- SPÖ: 92,225 votes (–1,184), 47.70% (–1.26), 1,537 local councillors (–19), 88 mayors (–7)
- ÖVP: 83,286 votes (+974), 43.07% (–0.07), 1,368 local councillors (+25), 78 mayors (+6)
- FPÖ: 5,680 votes (–4,023), 2.94% (–2.15), 53 local councillors (–43), 0 mayors (–1)
- FBL: 3,607, 1.87%, 30 local councillors, 1 mayor
- Grüne: 2,626 votes (–833), 1.36% (+0.42), 19 local councillors (+6), 0 mayors (±0)
- Others: 5,938 votes (+2,350), 3.07% (+1.19), 91 local councillors (+24), 4 mayors (+1)

Run-off mayoral elections were held in eight municipalities on 21 October 2007; seven candidates were from ÖVP and SPÖ, respectively, two from local lists. The SPÖ lost both of their mayoral positions in the run-off elections, losing one to the ÖVP (who held their other five) and one to a local list.

The election was declared invalid in Wiesen, as one of the candidates of an independent list (Unabhängige Liste Wiesen, ULW; "Independent List Wiesen") did not have passive suffrage since he did have his residence in the municipality; ULW got 12.8% of the vote and 3 seats in the municipal council in the election. The election was questioned by the SPÖ.
