= Walter Zimper =

Austrian politician (1942–2008)

- Born: April 29, 1942; Markt Piesting, Lower Austria
- Died: January 13, 2008 (aged 65); Sankt Pölten, Lower Austria

Walter Zimper (29 April 1942 – 13 January 2008) was an Austrian politician of the ÖVP.

Zimper studied at the Trading Academy at the University of Vienna. He was editor-in-chief of the Niederösterreichischen Volksblattes.

From 1970, he was part of the Gemeinderat (local council) in Markt Piesting and was Mayor from 1975 to 2002. From 1974 to 1982 Zimper was a member of the Lower Austrian parliament. From 1980 to 1982 Zimper was secretary of the Lower Austria ÖVP. Due to his alleged involvement in the WBO scandal, he had to resign from the office.

From 1999 to 2007, he was Vice President of the Austrian Association of Municipalities.
