= Joerg Kalt =

Austrian film director and cinematographer

- Born: Jörg Kalt; 11 January 1967; Suresnes, France
- Died: 1 July 2007 (aged 40); Austria
- Occupations: Film director, cinematographer and journalist
- Years active: 1993－2007

Joerg “Jörg” Kalt (11 January 1967 – 1 July 2007) was an Austrian film director and cinematographer best known for his film Crash Test Dummies.

Kalt was born on 11 January 1967, in Suresnes near Paris and grew up in Switzerland and Germany. He studied German and law before working as a journalist. He made his first film, Eternity Starts Here, in 1993 while studying at a film school in Prague and moved to Vienna the following year. Other than Crash Test Dummies his best known film is Richtung Zukunft durch die Nacht ("Direction Future Through the Night").

He committed suicide on 1 July 2007, while working on two projects: Tiere ("Animals"), and Zum Essen ("To Eat").
