= Ed Arno =

American cartoonist

Ed Arno (July 17, 1916 – May 27, 2008) was an Austrian-American cartoonist, caricaturist, illustrator and comics artist, contributing to The New Yorker from 1969 to 2001. He was born in Innsbruck, Austria, before moving to the United States. His work appeared in Aventurile lui Drix, Licurici, Luminita, The New York Times, Saturday Review, Cosmopolitan, and Harvard Business Review. His books The Magic Fish and The Gingerbread Man were set to music by Arthur Rubinstein. In 1998, he published a collection of his work, Ed Arno’s Most Wanted.
