= Franz Feldinger =

Austrian footballer (1928–2009)

Personal information
- Date of birth: 22 August 1928
- Place of birth: Salzburg, Austria
- Date of death: 16 March 2009 (aged 80)
- Place of death: Salzburg, Austria
- Position: Midfielder

International career
Years	Team	Apps	(Gls)
- Austria

Franz Feldinger (22 August 1928 – 16 March 2009) was an Austrian footballer. He competed in the men's tournament at the 1952 Summer Olympics.
