= Christian Bernhard =

Austrian politician (born 1963)

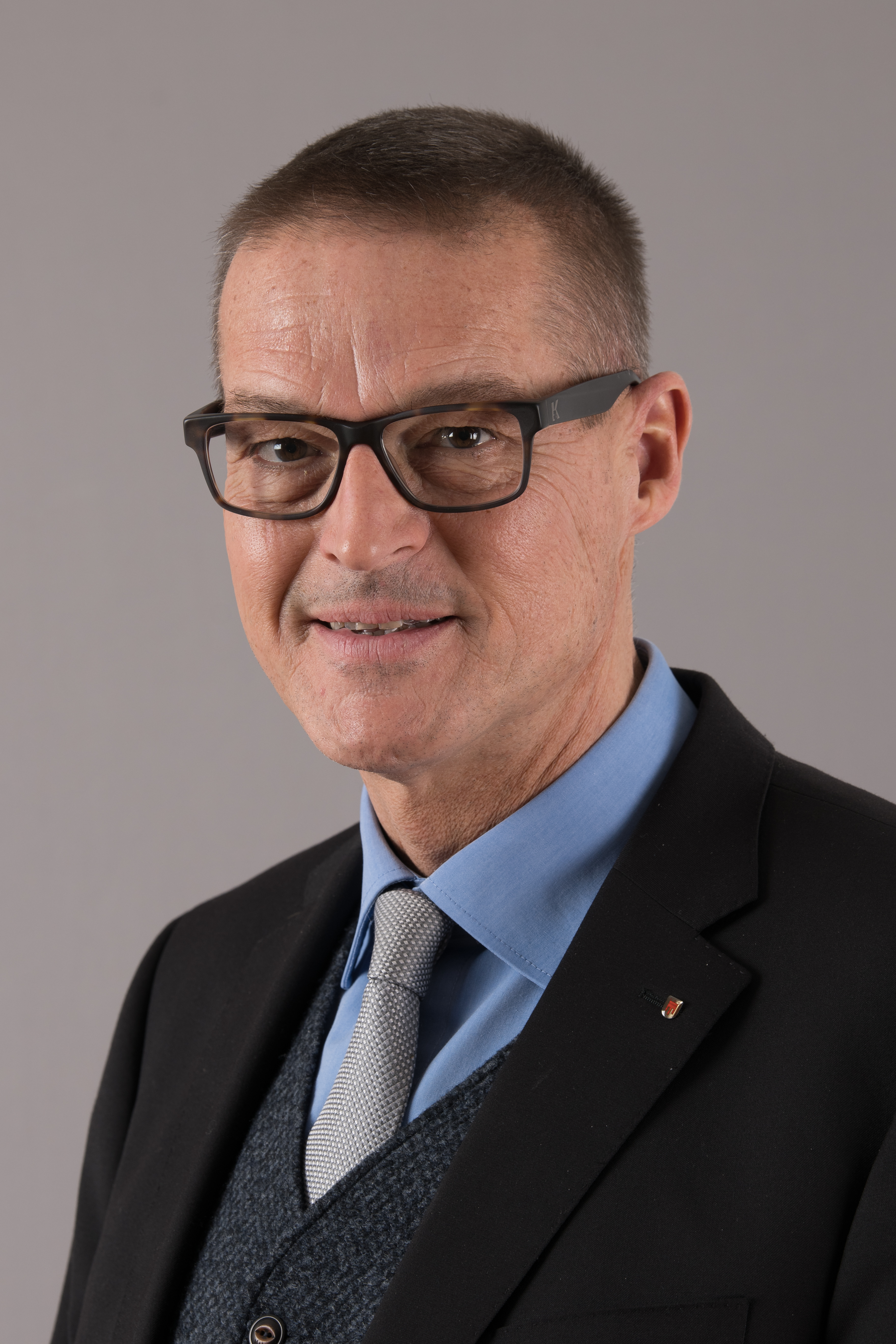
Christian Bernhard (2017)

Christian Bernhard (born 15 November 1963, Lustenau, Austria) is an Austrian politician in Vorarlberg. Bernhard is, since 6 June 2012, the Landesrat of Health and Disabled Aide of the Vorarlberg regional government.

Bernhard is single and lives in Dornbirn.

== Career ==
Bernhard was born on 15 November 1963 in the market town of Lustenau in the Vorarlberg region of the Rhine Valley. He graduated in 1982, passing Matura in Dornbirn's federal gymnasium and then studied medicine at the University of Innsbruck. There, in 1989, he earned a doctorate in General Medicine (Dr. med. Univ.) and then began training as a general practitioner, and first worked as a foundation doctor hospital in Dornbirn.

In 1993, Bernhard entered into politics in Vorarlberg and, in 1994, was head of the Department of Health in the Bludenz. From 2001 to 2011, he served as a medical officer and deputy department head of the medical department in the Office of the Provincial Government of Vorarlberg. On 1 July 2011, he was appointed head of the department of the medical unit and therefore bore the professional title of provincial health director.

After the surprising resignation of councilor Rainer Gögele on 1 June 2012, Bernhard was, after a meeting of parliament on 6 June, as his successor as Health Councillor. He took over from his predecessor the departments of health and disability assistance under the governance of Markus Wallner. At the same time with the election in the state government, Bernhard stepped into the ÖVP Vorarlberg branch, on June 29, followed by joining the Austrian Workers Federation Vorarlberg branch. After the reelection of Wallner, Bernhard has now also held the cultural department in addition to the health.
