= Hans Wagner (ice hockey) =

Austrian ice hockey player

Personal information
- Nationality: Austrian
- Born: 22 January 1923 Klagenfurt, Austria
- Died: 16 September 2010 (aged 87) Klagenfurt, Austria

Sport
- Sport: Ice hockey

Hans Wagner (22 January 1923 – 16 September 2010) was an Austrian ice hockey player. He competed in the men's tournament at the 1956 Winter Olympics.
