= Martin Rößler =

German church musician (1934–2024)

Martin Rößler, also Martin Rössler (1934 – 31 October 2024), was a German church musician, Protestant theologian, music director and university lecturer in Tübingen.

== Career ==
Born in Pforzheim, Rößler studied church music and Protestant theology. He was music director in the Tübinger Stift and was active in the training of theologians; after working in the parish offices in Hagelloch near Tübingen and Bronnweiler near Reutlingen, he taught liturgy and hymnology at the Protestant theological faculty of the University of Tübingen.

== Activity ==
Rößler was a collaborator to the Evangelisches Gesangbuch for the Protestant Church in Germany and for the Evangelical-Lutheran Church in Württemberg. As a preacher, Rößler published the highly acclaimed Liedpredigt, in which the theology, poetry and history of individual hymnbook verses were worked out. Rößler became known for his portrayal of melodists and poets of Christian hymnbooks. Various biographies have been worked up by Rößler according to historical criteria and today they often form the basis for the short biographies that have been published in all major hymnbooks. On the other hand, Rößler investigated the origin and development of hymnbooks, beginning with the Reformation.

In his Bronnweiler sermon volume Rößler as hymnologist published selected examples for the genre of a Liedpredigtde.

== Publications ==
- (as editor): Karl Ludwig Gerok: "Lehrgang der Orgelimprovisation". Hänssler, Neuhausen-Stuttgart, 1976.
- Die Liedpredigt. Geschichte einer Predigtgattung. Vandenhoeck & Ruprecht, Göttingen 1976.
- „Da Christus geboren war“ ... Texte, Typen und Themen des deutschen Weihnachtsliedes. Calwer, Stuttgart 1981, ISBN 3-7668-0680-7.
- Bist du es, der da kommen soll? Hagellocher Predigten nach Texten aus dem Matthäusevangelium. Tübingen 1982, ISBN 3-7805-0415-4.
- Festgedanken. Bronnweiler Predigten zum Kirchenjahr, Katzmann, Tübingen 1990, ISBN 3-7805-0453-7.
- Liedermacher im Gesangbuch. Volume 1. Calwer, Stuttgart 1990, ISBN 3-7668-3062-7.
- Liedermacher im Gesangbuch. Volume 2. Calwer, Stuttgart 1990, ISBN 3-7668-3063-5.
- Liedermacher im Gesangbuch. Volume 3. Calwer, Stuttgart 1991, ISBN 3-7668-3064-3.
- Liedermacher im Gesangbuch. Liedgeschichte in Lebensbildern. Calwer, Stuttgart 2001, ISBN 3-7668-3695-1.
- Geistliches Lied und kirchliches Gesangbuch. Munich 2007, ISBN 3-89912-091-4.
- Psalter und Harfe, wacht auf – Liedpredigten. Calwer, Stuttgart 2009, ISBN 978-3-7668-4112-4.
- Die Wittenbergisch Nachtigall – Martin Luther und seine Lieder. Calwer, Stuttgart 2015, ISBN 978-3-7668-4368-5.
- „Nicht klagen sollst du: loben!“ – Jochen Klepper – Leben und Lieder. Calwer, Stuttgart 2017, ISBN 978-3-7668-4430-9.
- Editor with Johann Hinrich Claussen: Große Predigten. 2000 Jahre Gottes Wort und christlicher Protest. Lambert Schneider, Darmstadt 2015, ISBN 978-3-650400710.
