= Jakob Mayr =

Austrian bishop

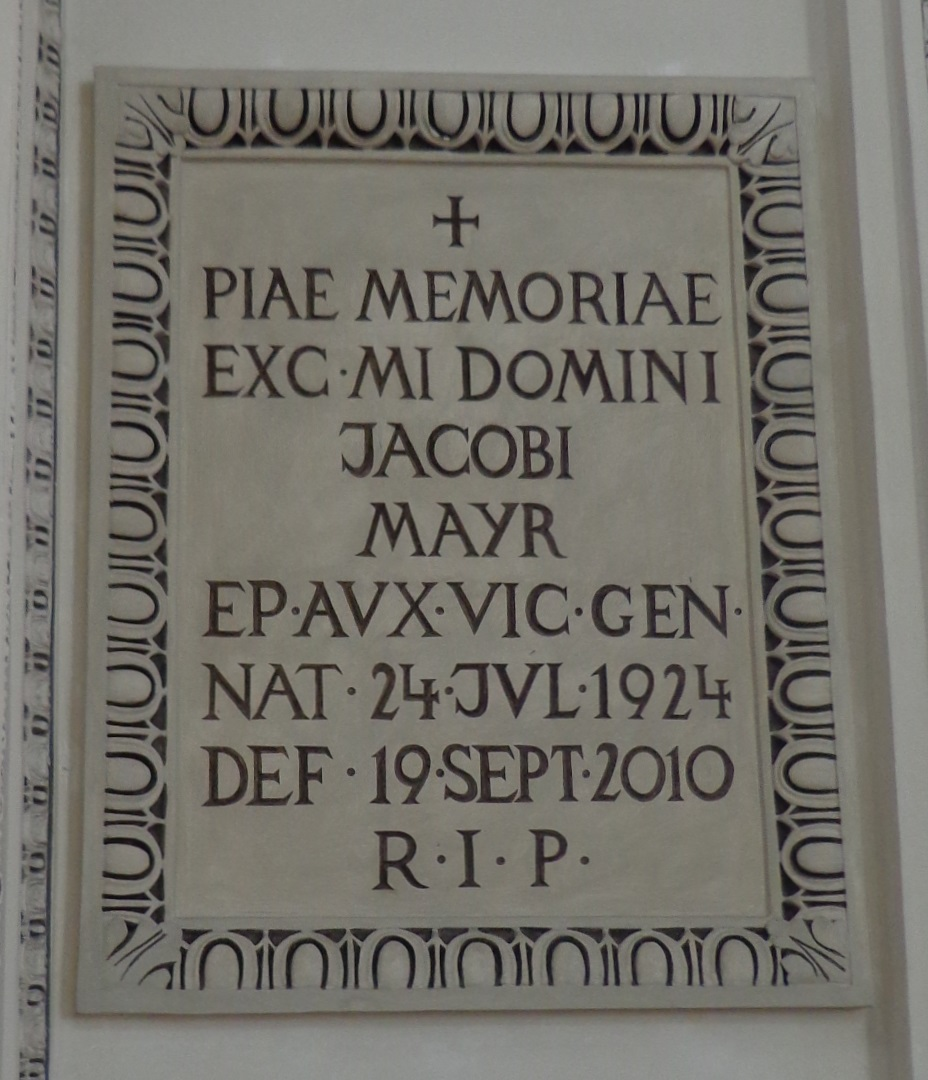
Salzburg Cathedral - wall tablet commemorating Jakob Mayr, Auxiliary Bishop in Salzburg

Jakob Mayr (24 July 1924 – 20 September 2010) was the Austrian prelate, who served as the auxiliary bishop of the Roman Catholic Archdiocese of Salzburg from his appointment on 12 May 1971, until his retirement on 15 August 2001. He also remained the bishop emeritus of the Archdiocese of Salzburg until his death in 2010.

Jakob Mayr was born on 24 July 1924. He died on 20 September 2010, at the age of 86.
