= Heinz Gappmayr =

Austrian artist

Heinz Gappmayr (7 October 1925, in Innsbruck – 20 April 2010, in Innsbruck) was an Austrian artist who created works of visual poetry.

== Publications ==
- auswahl. Mit einem Nachwort von Markus Klammer. Folio Verlag, Wien, Bozen 2009. ISBN 978-3-85256-488-3.
- mit Werner Herbst: Echo. 21 Blätter in Kassette, Herbstpresse, Wien 2003.
- mit Siegfried S. Schmidt, Franzobel: Josef Linschinger. Zyklen / Cycles. Kunstuniversität Linz, Ritter Verlag, Klagenfurt 2003, ISBN 3-85415-247-7.

== Literature ==
- Dorothea van der Koelen: Opus Heinz Gappmayr. Werkverzeichnis der visuellen und theoretischen Texte, Band 1: 1961–1990. van der Koelen Verlag, Mainz 1990, ISBN 978-3-926663-91-7
- Dorothea van der Koelen: Das Werk Heinz Gappmayrs. Darstellung und Analyse. Lit-Verlag, Münster 1994.
- Dorothea van der Koelen: Opus Heinz Gappmayr. Werkverzeichnis der visuellen und theoretischen Texte 1991–1996. Chorus-Verlag, Mainz/München 1997, ISBN 978-3-931876-15-9
- Dorothea van der Koelen: Heinz Gappmayr. Wort – Zahl – Zeichen, monographischer Beitrag für »Künstler«. Kritisches Lexikon der Gegenwartskunst, Weltkunst und Bruckmann-Verlag, München 1999
- Dorothea van der Koelen: Opus Heinz Gappmayr. Werkverzeichnis der visuellen und theoretischen Texte, Band 3: 1997–2004. Chorus-Verlag, Mainz 2005, ISBN 978-3-931876-56-2
