= Alexander Muxel =

Austrian politician and business consultant

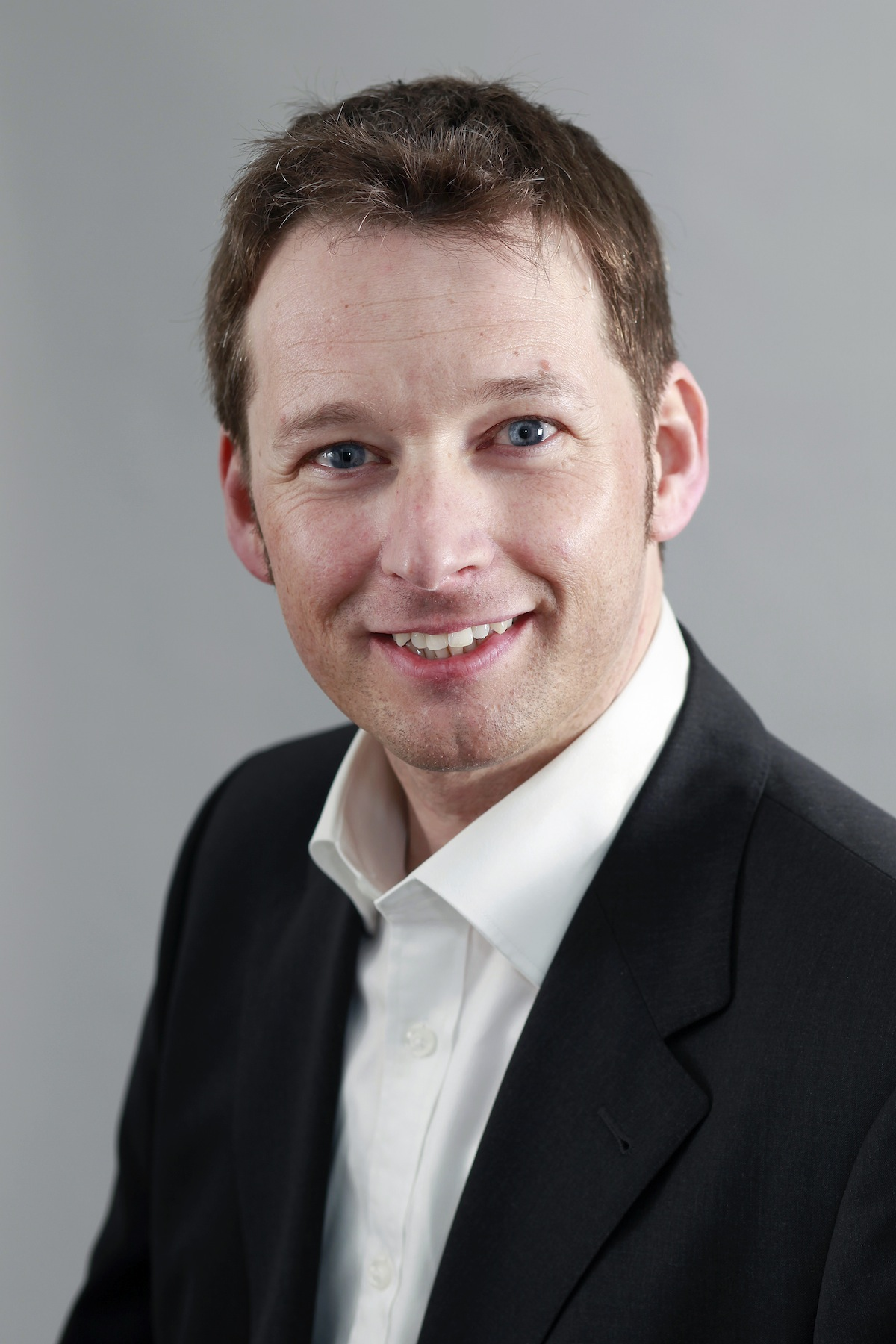
Alexander Muxel (2011)

Alexander Muxel (born 2 February 1969, Bludenz, Austria) is a former Austrian politician for the Austrian People's Party (ÖVP) and business manager. Muxel was, from 2011 to 2014, a deputy to the parliament of Vorarlberg.

== Life and work ==
Muxel was born on 2 February 1969 in the Vorarlberg district of Bludenz. From 1983 to 1988, he attended the Handelsakademie in Feldkirch, where he passed his matura. At the same time, he began his studies in business administration, specializing in marketing and corporate management at the University of Innsbruck. In March 1993, he finished his magister degree in social and economic sciences. Immediately afterwards, Muxel completed a postgraduate course in international marketing at the Katholieke Universiteit Leuven in Belgium. Thereafter, Muxel worked in various positions of several companies.

Muxel took his first political position when, in April 1995, he was first elected to the municipal councilor of his hometown of Rankweil. In the Rankweiler municipal council, he was the deputy committee of the Finance Committee. From 1996 to October 2001, he was also a councilor for culture, sports and clubs, as well as a council for finance. After the departure of Rainer Gögele, the former representative of the ÖVP Vorarlberg branch in the Landtag, who had been appointed as a provincial councilor to the Vorarlberg regional government, Muxel, as a deputy of the electoral district of Feldkirch on 14 December 2011, moved to the Landtag. In the 29th Vorarlberg Landtag, he was subsequently the area spokesperson for business and tourism. Even before the 2014 parliamentary election, Muxel announced that he would not again be a candidate for the state parliament and, after his election, decided to leave politics.

Muxel is married and the father of two children. He lives with his family and children in Rankweil.
