= Malcolm Mencer Martin =

Malcolm Mencer Martin (10 December 1920 – 8 October 2010), born Martin Menczer, was an Austrian-British pediatric endocrinologist. He spent the majority of his career at Georgetown University, where he was a professor of pediatric endocrinology.

== Early life ==
Martin Menczer was born in Vienna to Rosa (née Reisel Glaubach) and Karl Menczer, a haberdasher. He emigrated to the United Kingdom as a teenager after the Anschluss of Austria by Germany in 1938. He completed his secondary education at the Rutherford College of Technology in Newcastle upon Tyne. He was held in an internment camp on the Isle of Man at the beginning of World War II, before spending 15 months with 219 Company of the Pioneer Corps of the British Army. He then enrolled to study medicine at King's College, Newcastle, which was then a part of Durham University. He graduated in 1945 and changed his name to Malcolm Mencer Martin.

== Career ==
Martin was a house officer in Newcastle and moved to Bournemouth in 1947 and then London in 1948, working at the Hammersmith Hospital and the Middlesex Hospital from 1950 to 1956. He emigrated to the United States in December 1956 to take up a fellowship at Johns Hopkins Hospital in pediatric endocrinology. He completed another fellowship in endocrinology at Harvard Medical School before moving to Washington, D.C. in 1959 to work at Georgetown University. He remained at Georgetown for the rest of his career and was eventually appointed a professor of pediatric endocrinology.

At Georgetown, Martin researched the use of insulin pumps in diabetic children. He was one of the first researchers to describe the circadian patterns of the release of tropic hormones from the pituitary gland. He and his wife, Arline Avrick, a pathologist, published a textbook titled Molecular Pathology, which covered the molecular basis of various endocrine diseases.

== Later life ==
Martin retired soon after receiving a distinguished service award from Georgetown University in 2004. He died in 2010 from injuries sustained from being hit by a car and complications from his subsequent hospitalization.
