= Walter Pass =

Austrian university teacher and musicologist

Walter Pass (22 January 1942 – 7 March 2001) was an Austrian musicologist.

Born in Feldkirch, Vorarlberg, Pass studied music education, conducting, piano and singing (1960–1964) at the University of Music and Performing Arts Vienna. One year later he also studied musicology at the University of Vienna and graduated with a Dr. phil. In 1964 he became an assistant at the musicological institute there. His habilitation followed in 1973.

He was subsequently awarded a scholarship for research in Rome from 1974 to 1977. As successor to Franz Zagiba, he taught early music history as a full professor at the University of Vienna since 1981.

Pass died in Tullnerbach, Lower Austria at age 61 and was buried at Hernalser Friedhof (group 24, number 24) in Vienna.

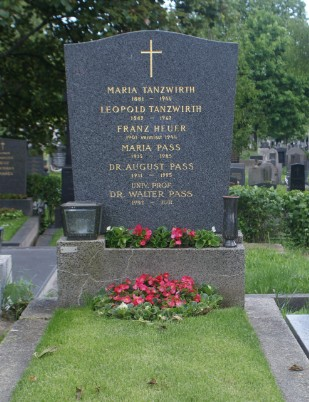
Tomb of Walter Pass

== Publications ==
- Musik und Musiker am Hof Maximilians II. Tutzing : Schneider, 1980.
- Gedenkschrift für Walter Pass. Tutzing : H. Schneider, 2002.
- Orpheus im Exil : die Vertreibung der österreichischen Musik von 1938 bis 1945. Vienna: Verlag für Gesellschaftskritik, ©1995.
- Thematischer Katalog sämtlicher Werke Jacob Regnarts, ca. 1540-1599. Vienna: H. Böhlaus, 1969.
- Musik in Vorarlberg.
