= Günther Schifter =

Austrian journalist (1923–2008)

Günther Schifter (23 December 1923 – 11 August 2008) was an Austrian journalist, radio presenter and record collector.

Born in Vienna, Schifter started collecting 78s of the popular music of the interwar years already as a boy. American popular music was banned by the authorities as Negermusik; Schifter was arrested at a dance in December 1944 and interned at Oberlanzendorf until 2 April 1945.

After the war, he played jazz and swing music in occupied Austria, becoming, in 1949, one of the first disc jockeys on Austrian radio. From 1967 to 2000 Schifter had a weekly radio programme, Günther Schifters Schellacks, where he played 78s from his vast personal archives (including, for example, more than 100 cover versions of W.C. Handy's "St. Louis Blues") while always refusing to resort to reissues of older material on vinyl records, audiotape or, later, CDs. In between songs Schifter developed his style of giving enjoyable history lessons.

Ousted by the Austrian state radio (ORF) in 2000 due to a switch to the more commercial music radio format, Schifter continued broadcasting for a while from Bavaria, Germany. He died on 11 August 2008, aged 84, in Salzburg.

== See also ==
- Swing Movement in Nazi Germany
