= Schalfkogel =

Mountain in the Ötztal Alps in Tyrol, Austria

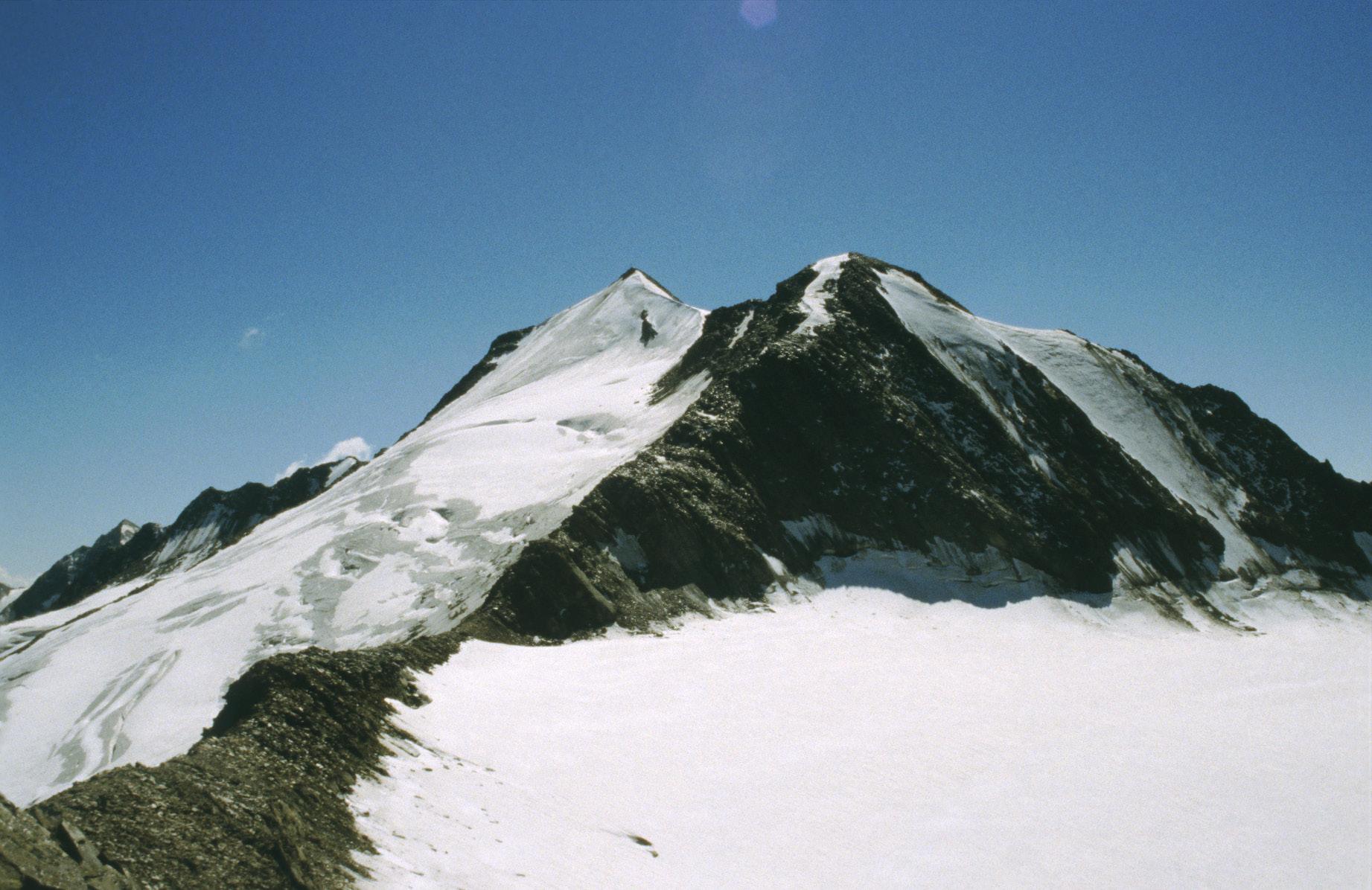
- Schalfkogel as seen from the north from the Firmisan pass

Highest point
- Elevation: 3,540 m (11,610 ft)
- Prominence: 355 m (1,165 ft)
- Parent peak: Grosser Ramolkogel
- Listing: Alpine mountains above 3000 m
- Coordinates: 46°48′06″N 10°57′33″E

Geography
- Location within Austria
- Location: Tyrol, Austria
- Parent range: Ötztal Alps

Climbing
- First ascent: 1830 by Frédéric Mercey
- Easiest route: South ridge

The Schalfkogel is a mountain in the Schnalskamm group of the Ötztal Alps.

== Avalanche ==
The 2009 Schalfkogel avalanche occurred in the municipality of Sölden (20km from the town itself), Austria on 3 May 2009. Six people were killed, five Czechs and one Slovak, when the disaster struck in the 3,500-metre (11,000 ft) Schalfkogel mountain range. The corpses were discovered to have been frozen. It was the deadliest avalanche to occur in Austria since March 2000. Although avalanches are a regular occurrence in the region, they mainly kill individuals as opposed to entire groups.
