= Herbert Sausgruber =

Austrian politician, former Governor of Vorarlberg

Governor of Vorarlberg
- In office 22 April 1997 – 7 December 2011
- Preceded by: Martin Purtscher
- Succeeded by: Markus Wallner

Personal details
- Born: 24 July 1946 (age 79) Bludenz, Austria
- Party: Austrian People's Party
- Occupation: Politician

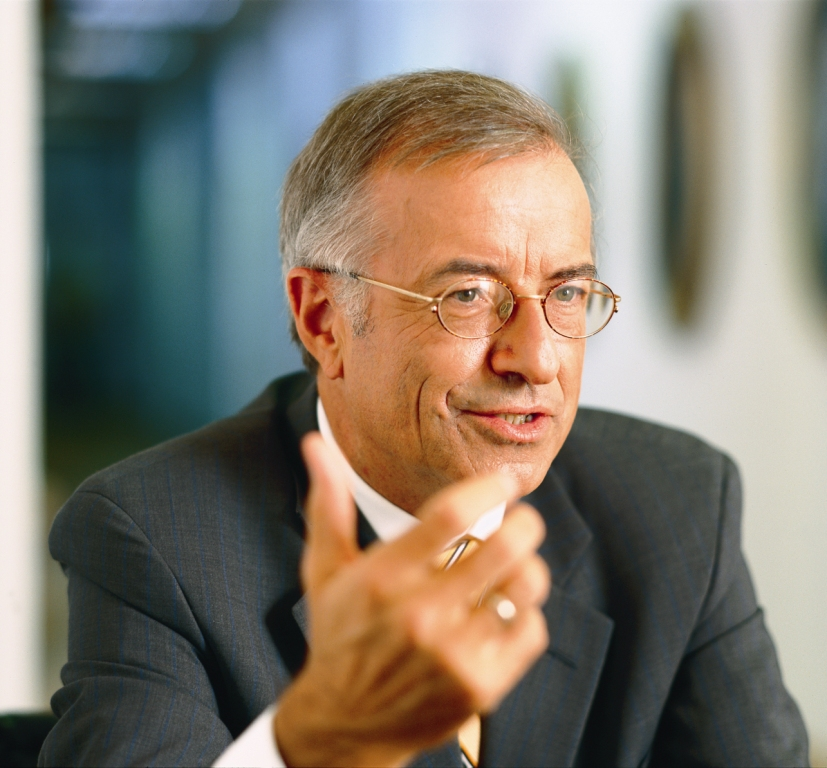
Sausgruber, former governor of Vorarlberg

Herbert Sausgruber (born July 24, 1946) was governor of the Austrian state of Vorarlberg and chairman of the Vorarlberg ÖVP.

== Education ==
After the Matura (general qualification for university entrance), Sausgruber he studied law and Catholic theology at the University of Innsbruck and become a member of the fraternity “AKV Tirolia”. He graduated in 1970 in jurisprudence.

== As public servant ==
After a year working in a court he was admitted to the public service. First he served as the chief of the youth welfare office in the counties of Bludenz, Feldkirch and Bregenz. After 1975 he worked in the office of the government of Vorarlberg.

== As politician ==
From 1975 on, he was vestryman in Höchst, from 1978 on chief of the parish council. In 1979 he became a member of the Vorarlberg Landtag. In 1981 he became Klubobmann of the ÖVP in the Landtag, 1986 he became the chairman of the Vorarlberg ÖVP. In 1990, he became the vice governor of Vorarlberg and on April 2, 1997 the Landtag voted him in the post of the governor of the state. He held this position till 2011.
