= 2021 Upper Austrian state election =

State election in Austria

- 26 September 2021

All 56 seats in the Landtag of Upper Austria 29 seats needed for a majority All 9 seats in the state government
- Turnout: 76.3% ▼5.3 pp
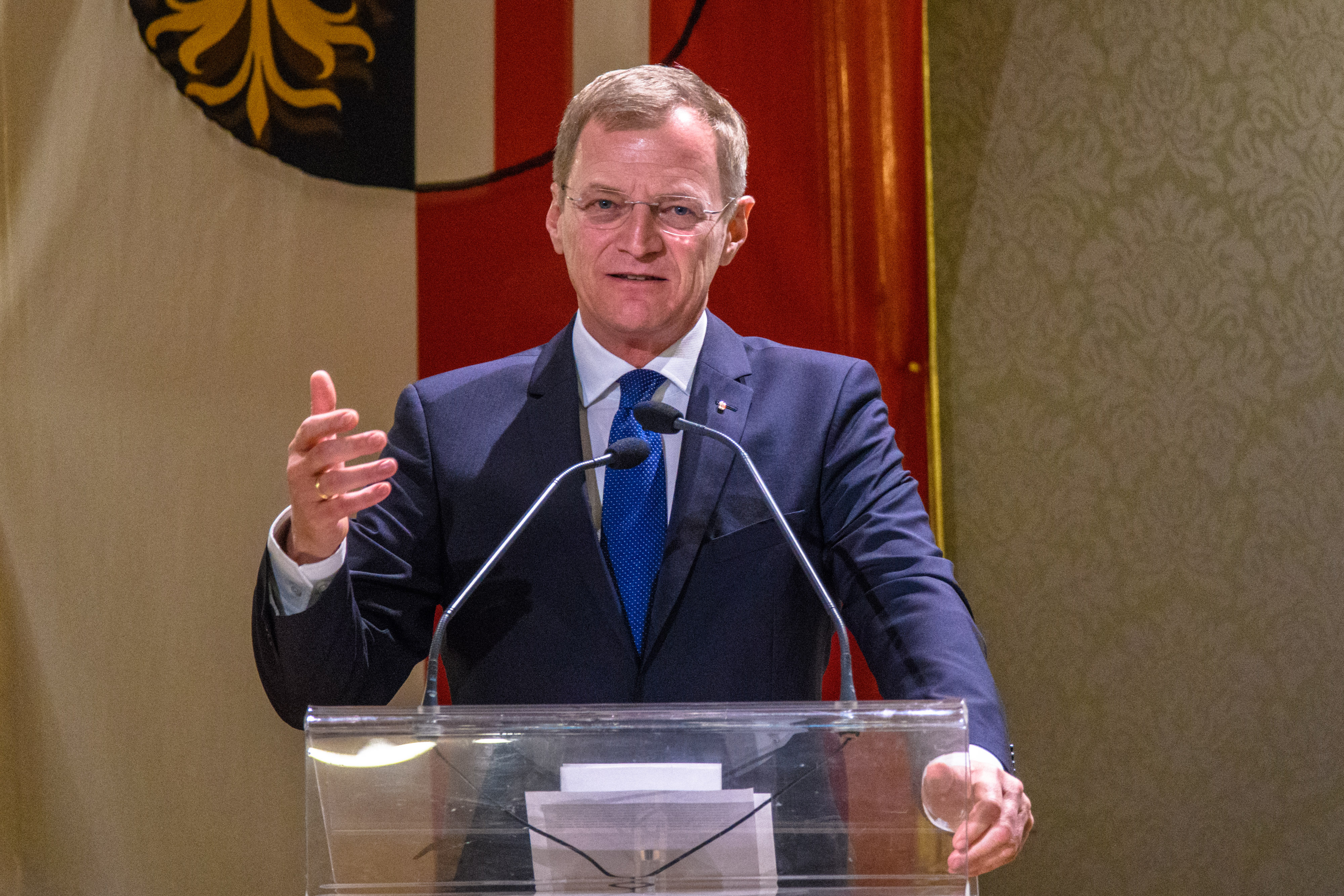

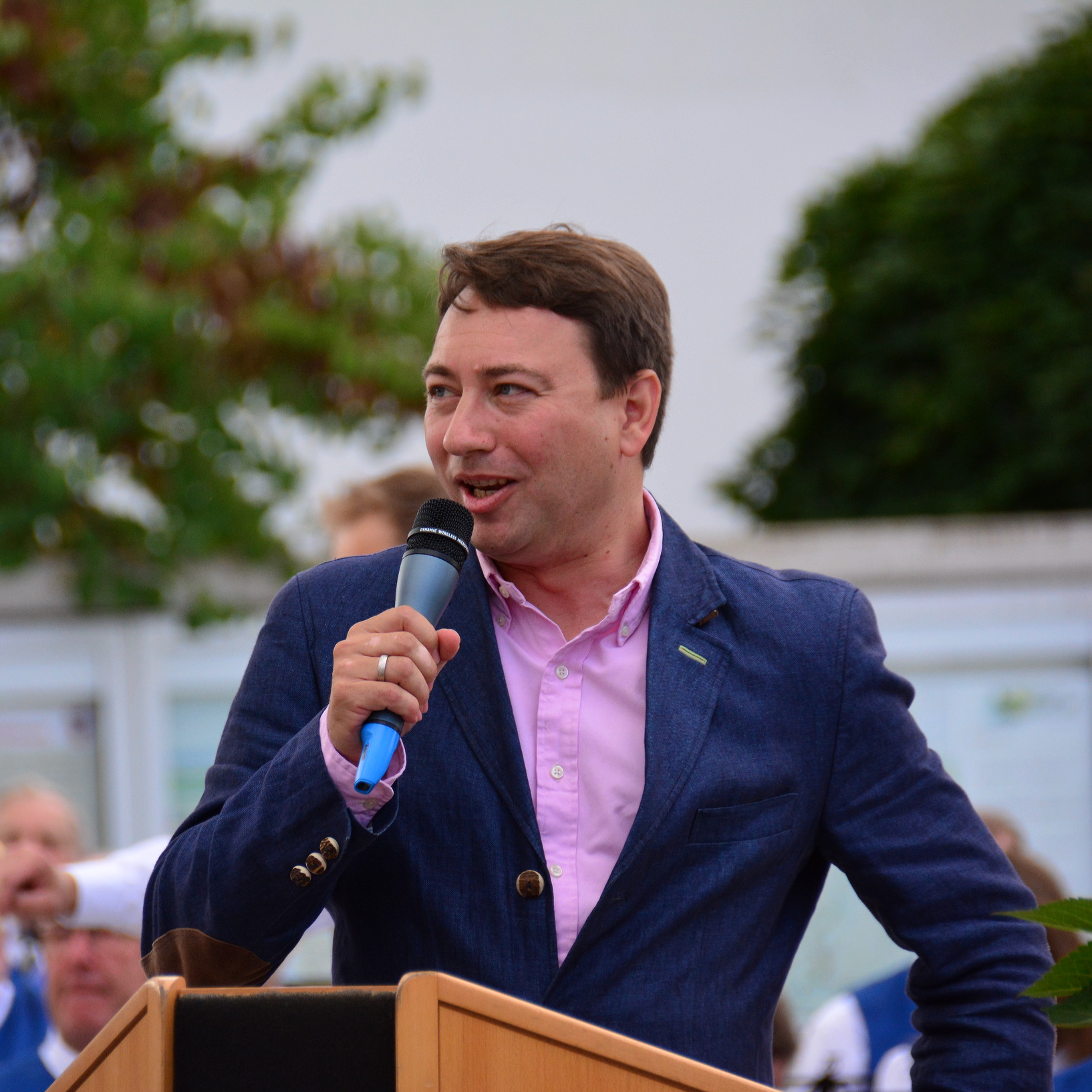

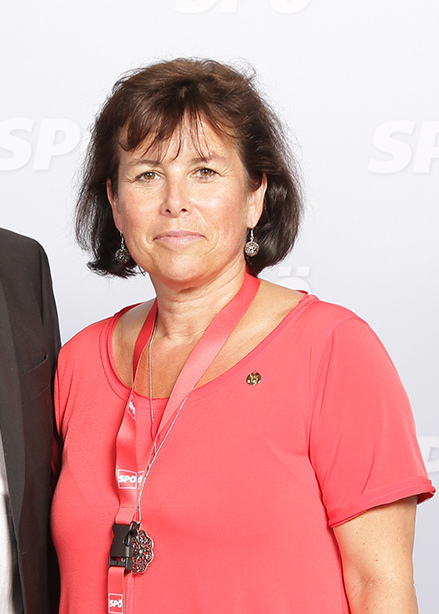

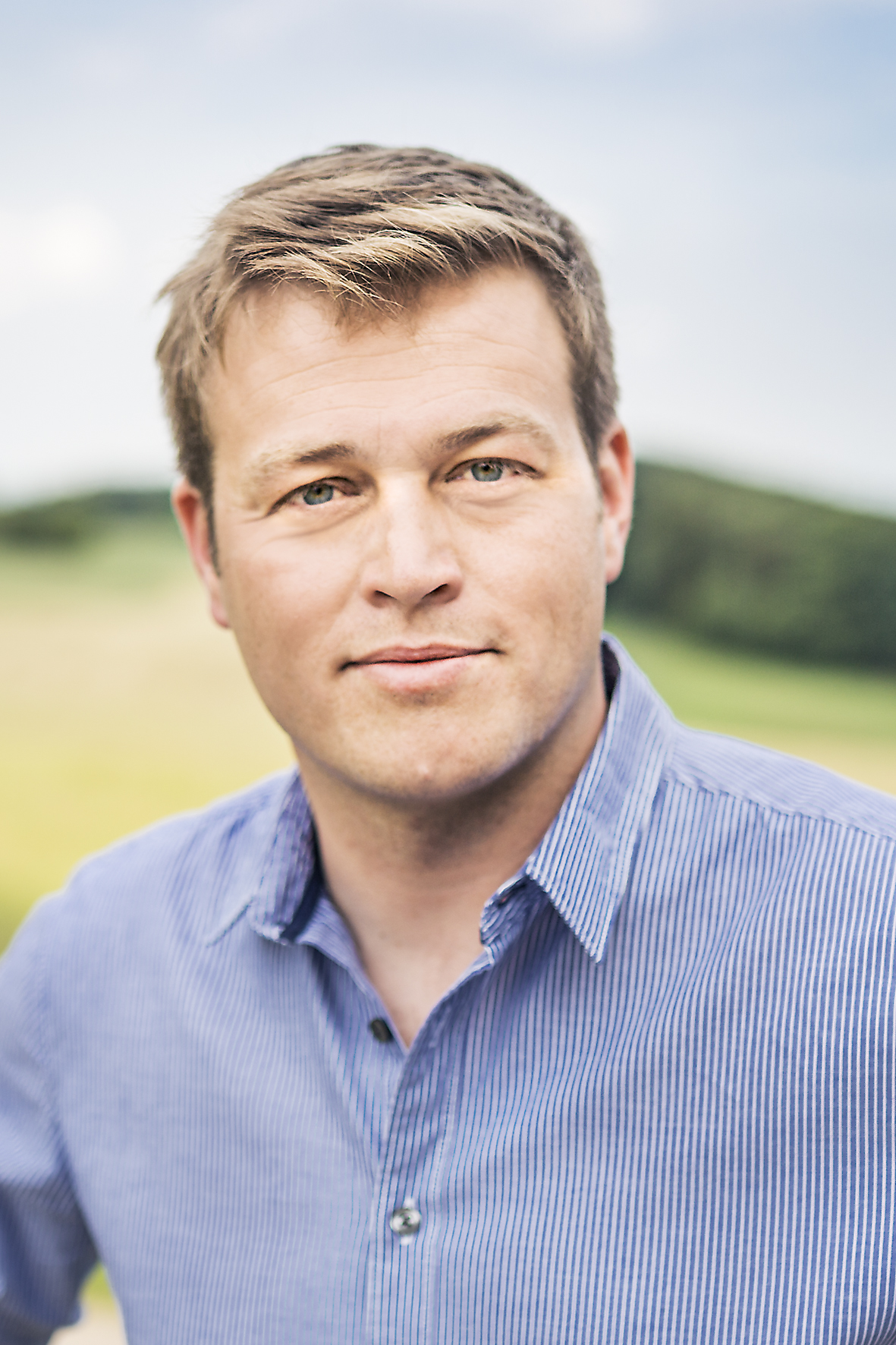
	First party	Second party	Third party
Leader	Thomas Stelzer	Manfred Haimbuchner	Birgit Gerstorfer
Party	ÖVP	FPÖ	SPÖ
Last election	21 seats, 36.4%	18 seats, 30.4%	11 seats, 18.4%
Seats won	22	11	11
Seat change	▲1	▼7	0
Popular vote	303,835	159,692	150,094
Percentage	37.6%	19.8%	18.6%
Swing	▲1.2%	▼10.6%	▲0.2%
	Fourth party	Fifth party	Sixth party
Leader	Stefan Kaineder	Joachim Aigner	Felix Eypeltauer
Party	Greens	MFG	NEOS
Last election	6 seats, 10.3%	Did not exist	0 seats, 3.5%
Seats won	7	3	2
Seat change	▲1	▲3	▲2
Popular vote	99,496	50,325	34,204
Percentage	12.3%	6.2%	4.2%
Swing	▲2.0%	New party	▲0.8%
- Results by municipality. The lighter shade indicates a plurality; the darker shade indicates a majority.
Governor before election
Thomas Stelzer
ÖVP
Elected Governor
Thomas Stelzer
ÖVP

The 2021 Upper Austrian state election was held on 26 September 2021 to elect the members of the Landtag of Upper Austria.

The Austrian People's Party (ÖVP) remained the largest party with small gains. Of the six parties which won seats in the Landtag, the Freedom Party of Austria (FPÖ) was the only one to suffer losses, falling from 31% of votes to 20%. The Social Democratic Party of Austria (SPÖ) recorded minimal change compared to 2015 and remained in third place with 19%, tying the FPÖ with 11 seats. The Greens improved their performance to over 12%. NEOS – The New Austria narrowly passed the electoral threshold and entered the Landtag for the first time with 4%. Unexpectedly, the anti-vaccination MFG party won 6% and three seats.

== Background ==
The Upper Austrian constitution mandates that cabinet positions in the state government (state councillors, German: Landesräte) be allocated between parties proportionally in accordance with the share of votes won by each; this is known as Proporz. As such, the government is a perpetual coalition of all parties that qualify for at least one state councillor. Despite this, parties still establish formal coalitions to organise cabinet positions and ensure a Landtag majority for legislative purposes.

In the 2015 state election, the ÖVP and SPÖ suffered major losses to the FPÖ, which doubled its vote share to 30% and became the second largest party. The ÖVP, lacking a majority in the state council, subsequently signed a working agreement with the FPÖ.

Governor Josef Pühringer resigned in 2017 after 22 years in office. He was succeeded on 6 April by Deputy Governor and fellow ÖVP member Thomas Stelzer, who was elected by the Landtag with 51 of 55 votes.

== Electoral system ==
The 56 seats of the Landtag of Upper Austria are elected via open list proportional representation in a two-step process. The seats are distributed between five multi-member constituencies. For parties to receive any representation in the Landtag, they must either win at least one seat in a constituency directly, or clear a 4 percent state-wide electoral threshold. Seats are distributed in constituencies according to the Hare quota, with any remaining seats allocated using the D'Hondt method at the state level, to ensure overall proportionality between a party's vote share and its share of seats.

== Contesting parties ==
The table below lists parties represented in the previous Landtag.

Name		Ideology	Leader	2015 result		
Name		Ideology	Leader	Votes (%)	Seats	Councillors
ÖVP	Austrian People's Party; Österreichische Volkspartei	Christian democracy	Thomas Stelzer	36.4%	21 / 56	4 / 9
FPÖ	Freedom Party of Austria; Freiheitliche Partei Österreichs	Right-wing populism Euroscepticism	Manfred Haimbuchner	30.4%	18 / 56	3 / 9
SPÖ	Social Democratic Party of Austria; Sozialdemokratische Partei Österreichs	Social democracy	Birgit Gerstorfer	18.4%	11 / 56	1 / 9
GRÜNE	The Greens – The Green Alternative; Die Grünen – Die Grüne Alternative	Green politics	Stefan Kaineder	10.3%	6 / 56	1 / 9

In addition to the parties already represented in the Landtag, seven parties collected enough signatures to be placed on the ballot.

- NEOS – The New Upper Austria (NEOS)
- MFG – Austria: People – Freedom – Fundamental Rights (MFG)
- Communist Party of Austria and Independent Left (KPÖ)
- Best Upper Austria – Honest, Transparent and Open Electoral Platform (BESTE)
- UBB Independent Citizens' Movement (UBB) – on the ballot only in Linz and Surrounds, Hausruckviertel, and Mühlviertel
- Christian Party of Austria (CPÖ) – on the ballot only in Hausruckviertel, Traunviertel, and Mühlviertel
- Referendum – on the ballot only in Linz and Surrounds and Hausruckviertel

=== Lead candidates ===
Party	Candidate	Offices held
ÖVP	Thomas Stelzer	Governor of Upper Austria (since 2017); Chairman of ÖVP Upper Austria (since 2017)
FPÖ	Manfred Haimbuchner	Deputy Governor of Upper Austria (since 2015)
SPÖ	Birgit Gerstorfer	Chairwoman of SPÖ Upper Austria (since 2016); State Councillor of Upper Austria (since 2016)
GRÜNE	Stefan Kaineder	Spokesman of The Greens Upper Austria (since 2019); State Councillor of Upper Austria (since 2020)

== Opinion polling ==
Polling firm	Fieldwork date	Sample size	ÖVP	FPÖ	SPÖ	Grüne	NEOS	MFG	Lead
2021 state election	26 Sep 2021	–	37.6	19.8	18.6	12.3	4.2	6.2	17.8
M & R Marktforschung	22 Sep 2021	500	38	22	18	12	5	4.5	16
Research Affairs	13–16 Sep 2021	400	41	23	17	11	5	3	18
GMK	September 2021	400	40	23.5	17	13	3	3	16.5
Market	9–14 Sep 2021	800	38	22	18	12	5	4	16
IFES	6–10 Sep 2021	838	39	19	20	13	5	4	19
Unique Research	6–9 Sep 2021	800	36	22	20	13	4	–	14
M & R Marktforschung	6–8 Sep 2021	500	38	23	18	12	5	3	15
Research Affairs	31 Aug-2 Sep 2021	400	40	25	17	11	5	—N/a	15
Spectra	23–31 Aug 2021	800	40	24	15	16	3	—N/a	16
ARGE Wahlen	23–26 Aug 2021	500	39	24	18	12	5	—N/a	15
Market	25 Aug 2021	?	40	22	18	12	6	—N/a	18
Unique Research	10–17 Aug 2021	800	38	22	18	12	6	—N/a	16
Spectra	21 Jun–5 Jul 2021	800	41	24	17	14	3	—N/a	17
GMK	21–23 Jun 2021	400	42	22.5	17	11	5	—N/a	19.5
IFES	25 May–11 Jun 2021	827	41	17	21	11	7	—N/a	20
Research Affairs	18–20 May 2021	300	38	25	20	12	4	—N/a	13
Unique Research	3–6 May 2021	800	39	21	21	12	6	—N/a	18
GMK	April 2021	400	39.5	21.5	18	13	4	—N/a	18
Spectra	4–12 Mar 2021	800	43	22	17	14	3	—N/a	21
M & R Marktforschung	27 Oct–6 Nov 2020	500	41.5	22.5	18.5	13.5	3.5	—N/a	19.0
Spectra	18 Jul 2020	?	42	24	15	15	3	—N/a	18
IMAS	25 Jul 2019	805	41	25	13	16	–	—N/a	16
Spectra	18 Jun–2 Jul 2019	700	42	24	15	14	–	—N/a	18
IFES	29 April 2019	1,000	37.5	23.5	21.0	8.5	–	—N/a	14.0
Spectra	21 Dec 2018	?	40	28	17	10	4	—N/a	12
Spectra	23 Aug–3 Sep 2018	687	41	29	17	8	4	—N/a	12
Spectra	17 Apr 2018	?	42	31	17	6	3	—N/a	11
ifab/Gallup	16 Feb 2018	?	41.5	26.5	20.5	8.5	2.5	—N/a	15.0
Spectra	23 Oct–3 Nov 2017	638	42	34	15	5	–	—N/a	8
Spectra	5–17 Jul 2017	551	42	34	14	8	–	—N/a	8
M & R Marktforschung	13 Jul 2017	500	40.5	28.5	17.5	9.5	2.5	—N/a	12.0
Spectra	24 Feb 2017	?	40	35	15	9	1	—N/a	5
IMAS	8 May 2016	?	33	34	18	11	4	—N/a	1
Spectra	8 May 2016	?	35	34	15	12	2	—N/a	1
IMAS	27 Dec 2015	1,000	34	32	17	13	4	—N/a	2
2015 state election	27 Sep 2015	–	36.4	30.4	18.4	10.3	3.5	–	6.0

== Results ==
Party	Votes	%	+/−	Seats	+/−	Coun.	+/−
Austrian People's Party (ÖVP)	303,835	37.61	+1.24	22	+1	4	±0
Freedom Party of Austria (FPÖ)	159,692	19.77	–10.59	11	–7	2	–1
Social Democratic Party of Austria (SPÖ)	150,094	18.58	+0.21	11	±0	2	+1
The Greens – The Green Alternative (GRÜNE)	99,496	12.32	+2.00	7	+1	1	±0
MFG – Austria People – Freedom – Fundamental Rights (MFG)	50,325	6.23	New	3	New	0	New
NEOS – The New Austria (NEOS)	34,204	4.23	+0.76	2	+2	0	±0
Communist Party of Austria (KPÖ)	6,504	0.81	+0.06	0	±0	0	±0
Best Upper Austria (BESTE)	1,977	0.24	New	0	New	0	New
Christian Party of Austria (CPÖ)	863	0.11	–0.25	0	±0	0	±0
Independent Citizens' Movement (UBB)	533	0.07	New	0	New	0	New
Referendum (R)	277	0.05	New	0	New	0	New
Invalid/blank votes	27,348	–	–	–	–	–	–
Total	835,248	100	–	56	0	9	0
Registered voters/turnout	1,094,074	76.34	–5.29	–	–	–	–
Source: Upper Austrian Government

Popular vote
ÖVP	37.61%
FPÖ	19.77%
SPÖ	18.58%
GRÜNE	12.32%
MFG	6.23%
NEOS	4.23%
Other	1.26%

Landtag seats
ÖVP	39.29%
FPÖ	19.64%
SPÖ	19.64%
GRÜNE	12.50%
MFG	5.36%
NEOS	3.57%

=== Results by constituency ===
Constituency	ÖVP		FPÖ		SPÖ		Grüne		MFG		NEOS		Others	Total seats	Turnout
Constituency	%	S	%	S	%	S	%	S	%	S	%	S	%	Total seats	Turnout
Linz and Surrounds	30.3	3	16.8	2	24.2	2	15.9	1	5.2		5.6		2.1	8	68.5
Innviertel	42.5	3	24.7	2	12.9	1	9.0		6.7		3.5		0.8	6	77.1
Hausruckviertel	37.8	5	22.6	3	17.1	2	11.7	1	5.7		4.1		1.1	11	77.2
Traunviertel	36.3	3	18.2	1	21.1	2	12.0	1	7.3		4.0		1.2	7	76.7
Mühlviertel	41.7	4	17.1	1	17.0	1	12.4	1	6.7		3.9		1.2	7	83.0
Remaining seats		4		2		3		3		3		2		17	
Total	37.6	22	19.8	11	18.6	11	12.3	7	6.2	3	4.2	2	1.3	56	76.3
Source: Upper Austrian Government

== Government formation ==
Compared to the previous legislative period, the ÖVP gained one state councillor while the FPÖ lost one, for a total of 5 ÖVP (includes the governor Thomas Stelzer), 2 FPÖ, 1 SPÖ, and 1 Greens. Three of the nine councillors will be women, up from zero in 2015. Compared to the previous election, 27 of the 56 members of the Landtag are new.

The ÖVP and FPÖ entered coalition talks after the election. On 20 October, they announced that they had successfully reached an agreement to renew their coalition. The contract was approved by the ÖVP and FPÖ party committees later the same day. The new governing contract emphasised further investment in renewable energy such as hydroelectric, wind, and photovoltaic systems on roofs, as well as more investment into public transportation, cancer research, and general research and development, and building Upper Austria as an economic hub. It also emphasised more traditional right-wing issues such as strengthening integration efforts for newly arrived migrants and offering fewer state benefits for those who refuse to participate.

The newly-elected state parliament convened on 23 October to invest the new government. Governor Stelzer was re-elected with 41 of 55 votes. The ÖVP–FPÖ coalition comprises 33 deputies, of which one member of the ÖVP was absent due to COVID quarantine, indicating that nine members of the opposition voted in favour. As the SPÖ and MFG indicated that they would vote against Stelzer's investiture, these votes likely came from the Greens (7 deputies) and NEOS (2). The new cabinet was also confirmed by the Landtag.
