= Black–green coalition =

German and Austrian political term

A black–green or green–black coalition (black–green or green–black for short) is a coalition between a conservative and/or Christian Democratic party (party colour black) and a green party (party colour green).

In Germany, a black–green coalition (German: schwarz-grüne Koalition) refers to a government with the participation of one or both of the Union parties: the Christian Democratic Union of Germany (CDU) and the Christian Social Union in Bavaria (CSU), and the Alliance 90/The Greens.

Under green leadership, this is also called a kiwi coalition and in Austria it is known as a turquoise–green coalition, referring to the colour of the Austrian People's Party.

== Background ==
=== The relationship between the CDU/CSU and the Greens in the 1980s ===
Among the founders of the Green Party there were many conservative environmentalists, the most famous of whom was the former CDU member of the Bundestag Herbert Gruhl. However, in 1980, the year the party was founded, left-wing forces prevailed within the Greens and most of their right wing supporters departed from the party all together.

After the Greens entered the Bundestag in the 1983 West German federal election, there were discussions within the Union about banning the new party or at least having it monitored by the Federal Office for the Protection of the Constitution as a potential opponent of the free and democratic basic order. According to Deutsche Welle, since the 1980s the Greens have become increasingly more conservative.

In 1984, the Green member of the Landtag of Baden-Württemberg, Rezzo Schlauch, was the first prominent politician to speak publicly about being able to imagine a black–green alliance in principle. In the same state, Minister-President of Baden-Württemberg Lothar Späth was Germany's first leading CDU politician to express sympathy for the Greens in 1988, when he said that the Greens "are the most interesting for me".

=== The "Pizza Connection" ===
In view of the great gap that separated conservative and green politicians in the 1980s in terms of content, rhetoric and habits, it seemed almost provocative that in the mid-1990s young up-and-coming politicians from the CDU and the Greens met for regular informal discussions in a Bonn pizzeria. The so-called "Pizza Connection" included Cem Özdemir, Volker Beck and Matthias Berninger on the Green side, and Norbert Röttgen, Peter Altmaier, Kristina Schröder, Ronald Pofalla, Hermann Gröhe, Eckart von Klaeden, Friedbert Pflüger and Andreas Krautscheid on the CDU side.

=== Municipal alliances since the mid-1990s ===
Black–Green coalitions in German cities
| 2001–2003 | Saarbrücken |
| 2003–2009 | Kiel |
| 2003–2004 | Cologne |
| 2003–2005 | Kassel |
| 2004–2009, 2020–present | Essen |
| 2004–2009 | Duisburg |
| 2006–2016 | Frankfurt am Main |
| 2006 | Oldenburg |
| 2009–2013 | Aachen |
| 2009–2014 | Bonn |
| 2016–2020 | Cologne |
| 2011–present | Darmstadt |
| 2015–present | Trier |
| 2018–present | Wuppertal (without its own majority) |
| 2020–present | Augsburg |
| 1994–1999, 2021–present | Mülheim an der Ruhr |
| 2021–present | Düsseldorf |

Black–green coalitions have existed at the local level since the mid-1990s. The first came about in post-industrial areas of North Rhine-Westphalia, where the Social Democratic Party of Germany (SPD) had long been the dominant political party. In 1994, Mülheim an der Ruhr became the first major city in the state to be governed by an alliance of the CDU and the Greens, which lasted until 1999. At some times, there were more black–green than red–green coalitions at the local level in North Rhine-Westphalia.

At the district level, the longest-standing black–green cooperation can be seen in the Hessian district of Marburg-Biedenkopf. This began in 2001 (with the participation of the FDP and the Free Citizens) and was renewed in 2006 and 2011 (since 2011 without FDP participation).

The largest city with a black–green coalition is currently Cologne. Saarbrücken was the first state capital with a black–green coalition (2001 to 2003). There was also a black–green coalition in the Schleswig-Holstein state capital Kiel from 2003 to 2009. In Oldenburg, a black–green coalition collapsed after just seven weeks of the 2006 Lower Saxony local elections after the CDU in the council voted in favour of building a shopping centre next to Oldenburg Castle, contrary to the coalition agreement. Previously, the CDU candidate for mayor, Gerd Schwandner (independent), had been elected in the second round of voting with the support of the Greens.

In Freiburg im Breisgau, the Greens and Young Freiburg together formed the largest faction in the local council and, until June 2018, the mayor, Dieter Salomon. Cooperation with the CDU faction was often problem-free. The best-known joint project nationwide is probably the failed sale of the municipal housing company Stadtbau GmbH. This was clearly rejected by 70 percent of the votes cast in Freiburg's first successful referendum.

Jamaica coalitions between the CDU, the Greens and the Free Democratic Party (FDP) are also more common at the local level.

== Black–Green at the state level ==
=== Background ===
Already in the run-up to the 1992 Baden-Württemberg state election, the then-Minister-President of Baden-Württemberg Erwin Teufel had declared that he also wanted to negotiate a coalition with the Baden-Württemberg Greens, but then allowed the exploratory talks with the party fall through.

In the run-up to the 2004 Thuringian state election, there was speculation about a coalition between the CDU and Alliance 90/The Greens. According to a TNS Emnid survey, 69 percent of Greens and 48 percent of CDU voters in this state said they would have welcomed such a coalition. Even before the 2004 Saxony state election, a black–green coalition was not ruled out from the outset.

Before the 2005 North Rhine-Westphalia state election, the leading candidates Jürgen Rüttgers (CDU) and Bärbel Höhn (Greens) appeared at several photo opportunities. Together they declared: "Black–Green is in the air". However, despite a narrow majority that was looming, Rüttgers opted for an adversarial election campaign and a coalition with the FDP (Black–yellow coalition).

Before the 2006 state elections, Baden-Württemberg's Minister-President Günther Oettinger (CDU) did not rule out a black–green coalition for his state, whose Greens are considered to be rather conservative. Although the CDUwas able to continue the coalition with the FDP after the state elections with a large majority, serious talks were started with the Greens, who had become the third strongest force. A few days later, however, the CDU decided to continue the black–yellow coalition. The Green parliamentary group leader in the Baden-Württemberg state parliament, Winfried Kretschmann, aimed for a black–green alliance for the period after the 2011 state elections. However, the election campaign became polarized in the wake of the increasing protests against Stuttgart 21 since 2010 and the decision by the black–yellow federal government to extend the operating life of German nuclear power plants. In the 2011 state elections, a green–red majority emerged, which elected Winfried Kretschmann as the first Green Minister-President.

In the state of Bremen, Senator for Construction Jens Eckhoff (CDU) suggested a black–green coalition for the period after the state elections in 2007.

=== The first black–green state government in Hamburg (2008–2010) ===
Since the CDU won an absolute majority in the Hamburg Parliament after the 2004 Hamburg state election, the formation of a coalition was unnecessary. However, the CDU and GAL formed black–green coalitions at district level. The former Green Hamburg Senator Krista Sager announced in September 2007 that black–green was a very realistic option after the Hamburg state election in February 2008. At their state party conference in October 2007, the Hamburg Greens kept the black–green option open and at the same time ruled out any cooperation with Die Linke. Mayor Ole von Beust also preferred this coalition to a coalition with the SPD in the 2008 election campaign, in case the CDU's absolute majority was not confirmed in the election. In the 2008 Hamburg state election on 24 February 2008, the CDU and Alliance 90/The Greens Hamburg received an absolute majority overall, so that the formation of a black–green coalition was mathematically possible. In the meantime, both parties decided to start coalition negotiations. On 16 April 2008, the CDU and GAL parliamentary group leaders announced in Hamburg that they had reached a coalition agreement in principle. On 27 April 2008, the GAL Hamburg base approved the coalition agreement. With the approval of the CDU state party conference on 28 April, the first black–green coalition in Hamburg was agreed by both parties. The black–green third Beust Senate was in office from 7 May 2008, before being replaced by the Ahlhaus Senate after Beust's resignation on 25 August 2010.

On 28 November 2010, the Greens announced that they would leave the coalition. This meant that the first black–green alliance at the state level had collapsed. In the subsequent new election in 2011, the CDU lost almost half of its 2008 vote share, with a loss of 20.7 percentage points, while the Greens were able to gain slightly. The SPD gained an absolute majority.

=== Hesse ===
==== Black–Green Coalition in the State Welfare Association of Hesse ====
As early as 2005, there was a black–green collaboration in the State Welfare Association of Hesse, the "Hessian Social Parliament" with the participation of the FDP (Jamaica Alliance). With the Greens' strengthening after the Hessian local elections in 2011, the FDP left the alliance and after the conclusion of a black–green coalition agreement the then Green state parliament member, Andreas Jürgens, was elected full-time First Deputy.

==== Coalition in Hesse (2014–2024) ====
The 2013 Hessian state election took place on the same day as the 2013 federal election. Volker Bouffier (CDU), Minister-President of Hesse since September 2010, was the CDU's top candidate. The CDU received 38.3% (+1.1 percentage points); the SPD 30.7 (+7.0 percentage points), the FDP 5.0 (−11.2 percentage points), the Greens 11.2 (−2.2 percentage points), Die Linke 5.2%.

The black–yellow coalition that had existed until then no longer had a majority of seats in the Landtag of Hesse. In the exploratory talks after the state election, the possibilities for a grand coalition or a red–red–green coalition were also explored. After four exploratory talks between the negotiators Bouffier and Tarek Al-Wazir (Greens), on 22 November 2013, the CDU offered the Greens the opportunity to start the first black–green coalition negotiations in a German federal state. It did this despite the fact that the SPD had signaled its willingness to form a grand coalition (which was emerging at the federal level at the same time).

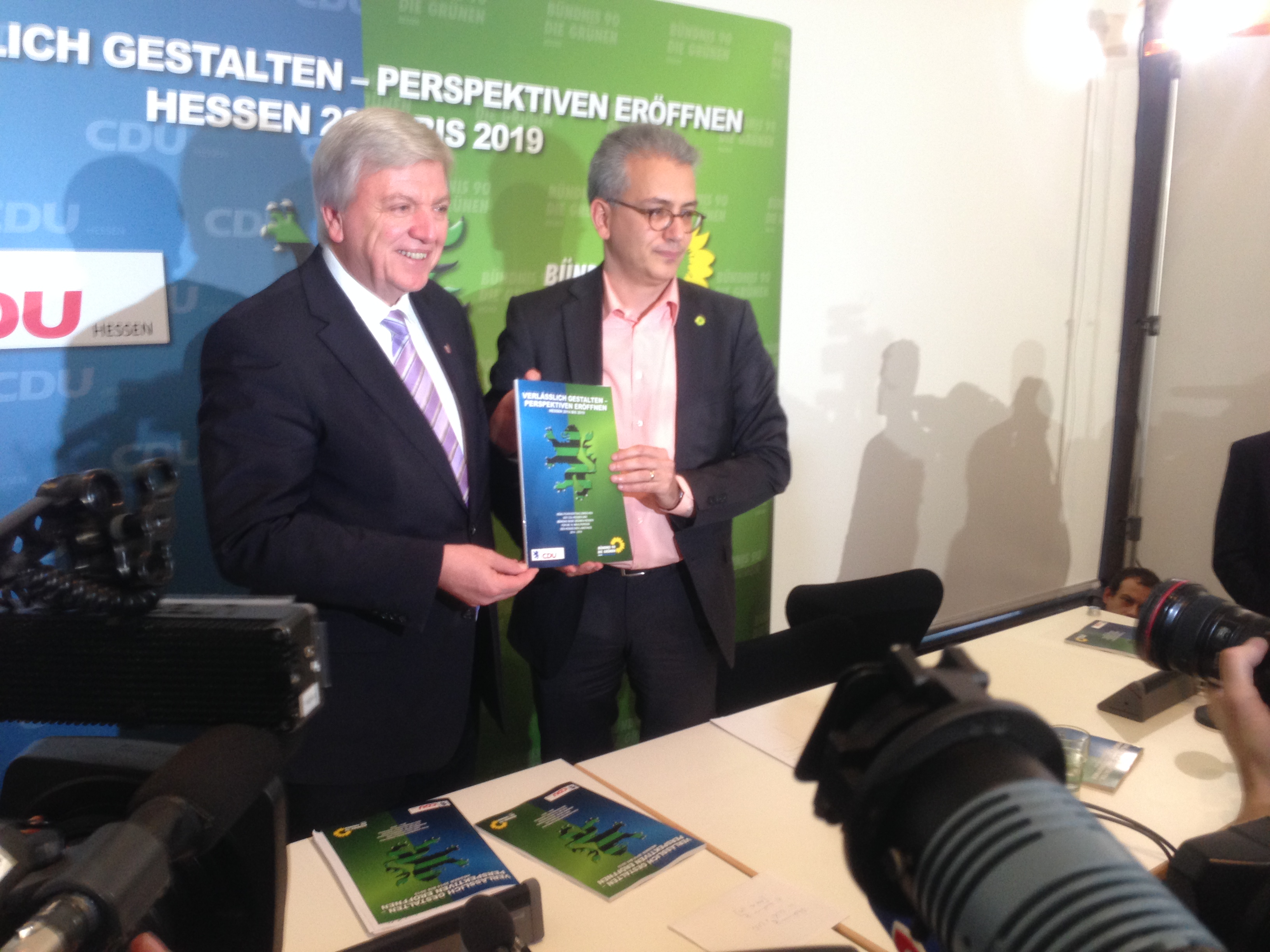
Bouffier (CDU) and Al-Wazir (Greens) present the black–green coalition agreement on 18 December 2013.

The Green Party Council accepted this offer with a majority of 51:6 votes. In the night of 16 to 17 December 2013, the CDU and the Greens agreed on a coalition agreement entitled " Design reliably – open up perspectives" . After the CDU state committee unanimously approved the coalition agreement on 21 December 2013, the Green Party members voted in favour of the coalition agreement at a state party conference on the same day with 74.24 percent.

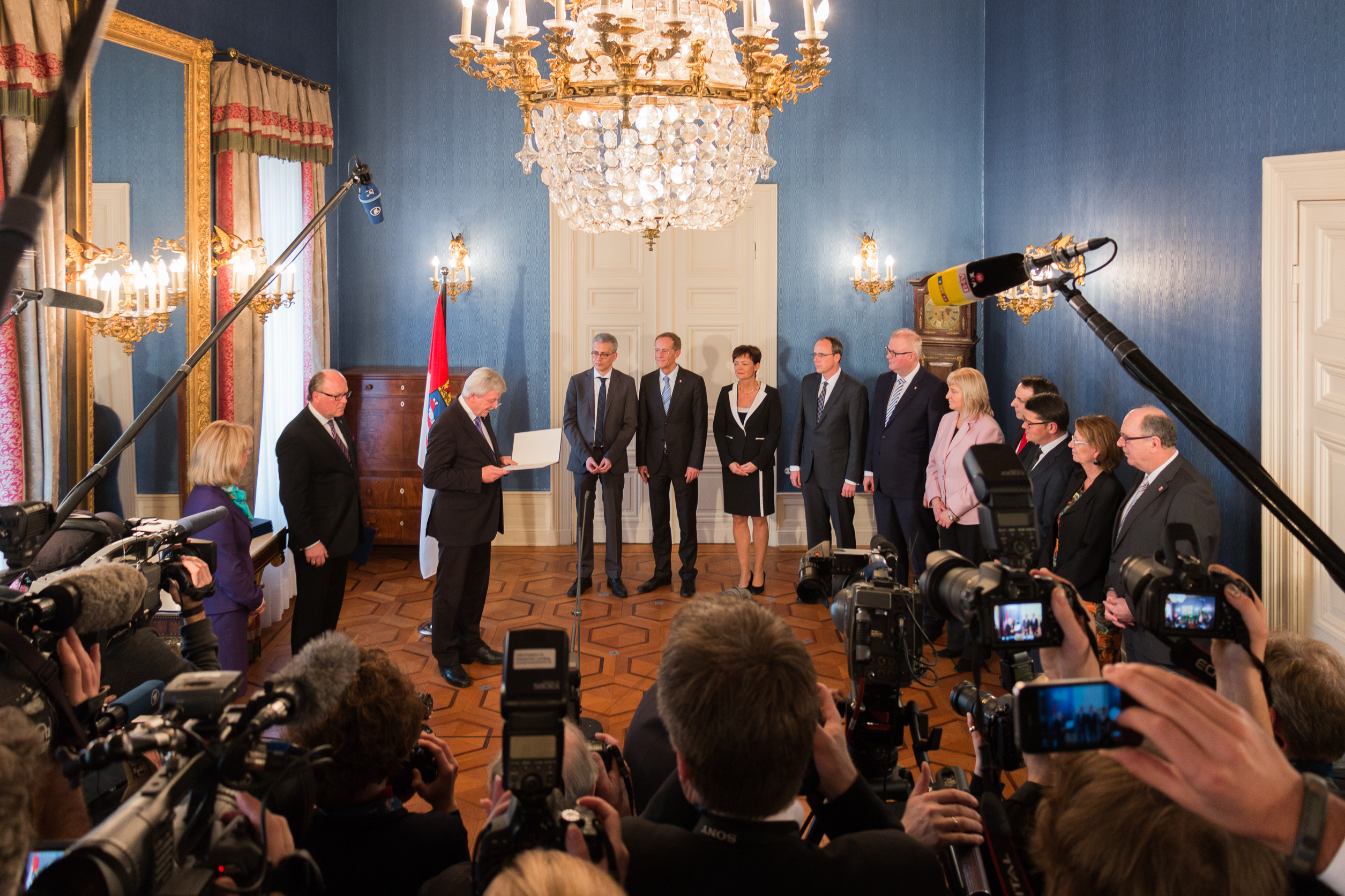
Appointment of the ministers of the black–green Bouffier cabinet on 18 January 2014.

On 18 January 2014, Volker Bouffier was re-elected as Minister-President in the constituent session of the Landtag of Hesse with 62 votes, thus receiving one vote more than the CDU and the Greens combined. The second Bouffier cabinet was then appointed and sworn in.

Thanks to the Greens' gain in votes, the black–green state government achieved a one-vote majority in the 2018 Hessian state election, despite the CDU's loss of votes. This was the first time that a black–green coalition above the local level had lasted for an entire legislative period and was even confirmed.

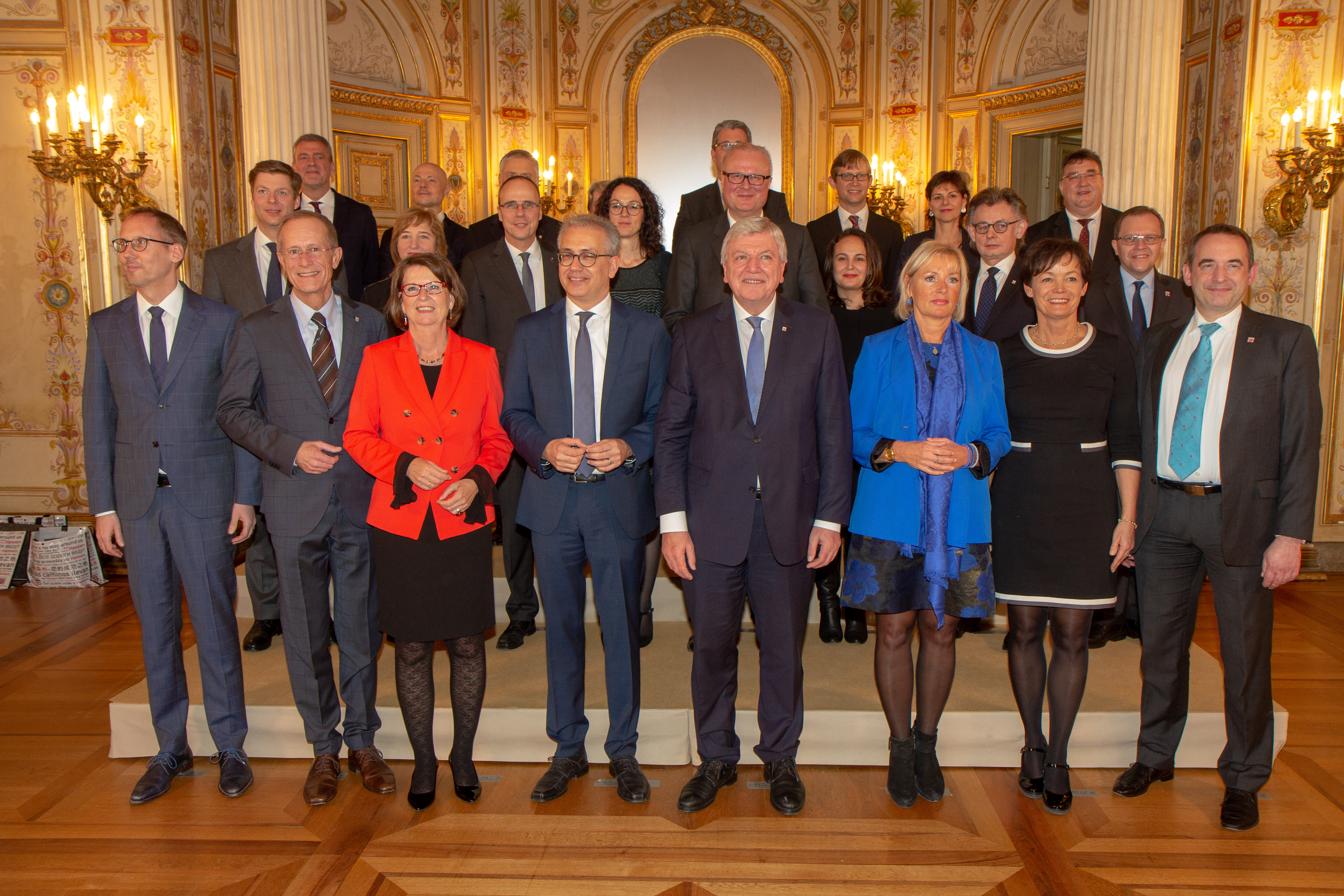
Constituent session of the Landtag of Hesse on 18 January 2019 in Wiesbaden.

After the first exploratory talks, alternatives to a continuation of the black–green coalition were rejected by at least one potential coalition partner. Therefore, immediately after the announcement of the final election results, the state executive boards of the CDU and the Greens unanimously decided to start coalition negotiations on an extension of the cooperation for a further five years. After successful negotiations, the second coalition agreement between the black–green coalition in Hesse was signed in December 2018. On 18 January 2019, the third Bouffier cabinet was sworn in.

Following the resignation of Minister-President Bouffier, the first Rhein cabinet was formed on 31 May 2022. After the 2023 Hessian state election, a black–red cabinet was formed in January 2024 (Second Rhein cabinet); the Greens left the government.

=== Coalition in Baden-Württemberg (since May 2016) ===
After the 2016 Baden-Württemberg state election, in which the previous green–red state government lost its majority and the CDU was also unable to form a coalition in a three-way alliance with the FDP and SPD, the Greens and the CDU agreed to start coalition talks after exploratory talks. These ended successfully and on 2 May 2016, the green–black coalition agreement was presented to the public. The second Kretschmann cabinet was the first coalition government between the Greens and the CDU led by the Greens at the state level. On 12 May 2016, the Landtag of Baden-Württemberg elected Kretschmann as minister-president. After the 2021 Baden-Württemberg state election, coalition talks between the Greens and the CDU led to the formation of the third Kretschmann cabinet. On 12 May 2021, the state parliament of Baden-Württemberg re-elected Kretschmann as minister-president.

=== Coalition in North Rhine-Westphalia (since June 2022) ===
In the 2022 North Rhine-Westphalia state election, the black–yellow state government lost its majority. A red–green coalition was discussed before the election, but also failed to achieve a majority. Based on the numbers, a traffic light coalition and a black–green coalition potentially had a majority in the Landtag of North Rhine-Westphalia. Due to their poor results, the Free Democrats rejected participation in a traffic light coalition.

At the end of May 2022, after successful black–green exploratory talks, coalition negotiations began. On 23 June 2022, the finished coalition agreement was presented to the public. The coalition negotiations were very calm. At the respective party conferences on 25 June 2022, the coalition agreement was confirmed by the parties. In the CDU, the delegates voted almost unanimously for the agreement. Among the Greens, the agreement received 85% approval.

On 27 June 2022, the contract was signed, on 28 June 2022, Hendrik Wüst (CDU) was elected Minister-President in the first round of voting and on 29 June 2022, the first black–green cabinet in the state was appointed and sworn in.

=== Coalition in Schleswig-Holstein (since June 2022) ===
The CDU narrowly missed the absolute majority in the 2022 Schleswig-Holstein state election. There were then several coalition options. The incumbent Minister-President and CDU top candidate Daniel Günther favoured the continuation of the Jamaica coalition, although black–green and black–yellow would have a simple majority. After the exploratory talks failed, the CDU decided in favour of black–green coalition negotiations.

On 22 June 2022, the contract was presented to the public. After the party congresses approved it, Günther was re-elected on 29 June 2022 and appointed his black–green cabinet.

== Black–Green at the federal level ==
Among the Greens, federal politicians such as Jerzy Montag, Werner Schulz and Reinhard Loske have called for a black–green coalition as another possibility for green participation in the federal government.

Before the 2005 German federal election, the then Federal Foreign Minister and Green politician Joschka Fischer rejected a black–green coalition: "I would not know how I could agree on a common policy with Angela Merkel and Mr Kirchhof." (Quote from 6 September 2005). Nevertheless, after the election he advised his party to open up "also to the bourgeois parties, but very cautiously."

After the 2005 federal election, a black–green coalition did not achieve a majority on its own, but only together with the FDP. This constellation, which was first discussed at the federal level after the federal election, is known as the Jamaica coalition or Schwampel (for: black traffic light). CDU leader Angela Merkel, who had rejected black–green at the federal level in her book My Way ("Not in this decade"), showed a willingness to negotiate a Jamaica coalition after the federal election.

In 2007, the Green Bundestag Vice President Katrin Göring-Eckardt campaigned for a Jamaica coalition in which the Greens could act as an "ecological and social conscience". The former Green finance expert Oswald Metzger was also considered an advocate of cooperation between the CDU/CSU and the Greens. However, he left the Alliance 90/The Greens party in November 2007 and joined the CDU in March 2008, meaning that the black–green project lost a prominent advocate on the Green side.

After the 2017 German federal election, the SPD initially rejected further participation in the government in view of the result. CDU/CSU, FDP and Greens held exploratory talks on a Jamaica coalition for the first time at the federal level. The FDP broke these off after four weeks. The FDP federal chairman Christian Lindner said that it was "better not to govern than to govern wrongly".

=== Arguments for and against Black–Green ===
Compared to other coalition arrangements, this model is still quite young, as both parties have long-standing opposition to cooperation. However, there are some voices in both camps in favour of a black–green coalition, also at the level of the federal states or the federal government. This goes hand in hand with a socio-economic rapprochement between the voting milieus of the Greens and the Union ("New Citizenship"), which is not necessarily linked to a political rapprochement. The common values and concerns mentioned are the preservation of creation, subsidiarity, decentralization, personal responsibility of the individual, solid finances, an intact homeland and a healthy environment.

The Union parties are looking for a strategic coalition alternative. In recent years, the SPD has entered into coalitions at federal or state level with the CDU (red–black coalition), with the FDP (social liberal coalition), with the Greens (red–green coalition) and the PDS or Left Party (red–red coalition), as well as a minority government with PDS tolerance (Magdeburg model), traffic light coalitions (with the FDP and the Greens) and, in Schleswig-Holstein, a coalition with the Greens and the South Schleswig Voters' Association (SSW), the so-called Danish traffic light coalition. The SPD has thus implemented seven coalition variants. The CDU, on the other hand, currently only has Black–yellow coalition and black–red as coalition options. For example, Jürgen Rüttgers, the CDU's top candidate at the time and Minister-President of North Rhine-Westphalia from 2005 to 2010, explained his temporary flirtation with the Greens before the 2005 North Rhine-Westphalia state election by saying that having several coalition options gave me "a great deal of freedom".

The Greens have a broader range of coalition options with the tried and tested red–green coalition, possible alliances involving the Left Party (red–red–green coalition) and the traffic light coalition, which is rarely realised. However, all of these alliances are necessarily linked to the SPD's participation in government. The realistic possibility of a black–green coalition alone strengthens the Greens' negotiating position vis-à-vis the SPD. There is also another argument in favour of black–green for the Greens: where the Left Party is strong, an alliance of the SPD and the Greens has little chance of entering into a coalition without a third party, i.e. the Left Party or the FDP.

With the extension of the operating life of German nuclear power plants by the black–yellow federal government in autumn 2010, which was fiercely opposed by the Greens, the Union and the Greens again drifted apart. From the end of 2010, the Union identified the Greens as its new main opponent. Due to the rejection of various major projects such as the Stuttgart 21 train station reconstruction or the Munich Olympic bid, politicians from the CDU, CSU and FDP repeatedly referred to Alliance 90/The Greens as the "anti-party" during the election campaign. In November 2010, Angela Merkel declared a black–green alliance to be a "pipe dream".

After the decision to phase out nuclear power in June 2011 following the Fukushima nuclear accident, this point of contention between the CDU/CSU and the Greens seemed to have been resolved. However, with the changes on the international energy markets in 2022 (reaction with trade changes or sanctions to the Russian invasion of Ukraine), an extension of the operating life of German nuclear power plants is once again an issue, as are changes surrounding the phase-out of coal in Germany.

== Austria ==
The parties involved

ÖVP (turquoise)

Greens (green)

In Austria, black–green refers to a coalition between the Austrian People's Party (ÖVP) and the Greens. After the party's colour was changed under Sebastian Kurz in 2017, it is also referred to as turquoise–green, but currently often only explicitly for the federal level.

=== Federal level ===
At the federal level, there were lengthy government negotiations between the ÖVP and the Greens after the 2002 Austrian legislative election. At the time, ÖVP Chancellor Wolfgang Schüssel had ended the black–blue coalition that had existed since 2000 (First Schüssel government) and called for early elections. The coalition talks failed, however, not least because of disagreements on social and pension issues, tuition fees and military armament projects. Ultimately, Schüssel decided to form another coalition with the Freedom Party (Second Schüssel government).

Nevertheless, the Greens have since been considered a possible coalition partner of the ÖVP and are thus no longer exclusively tied to the Social Democratic Party of Austria (SPÖ) as the majority of the left. However, the Green top candidate Ulrike Lunacek ruled out a coalition with Kurz's ÖVP after the 2017 Austrian legislative election due to its more right-wing course.

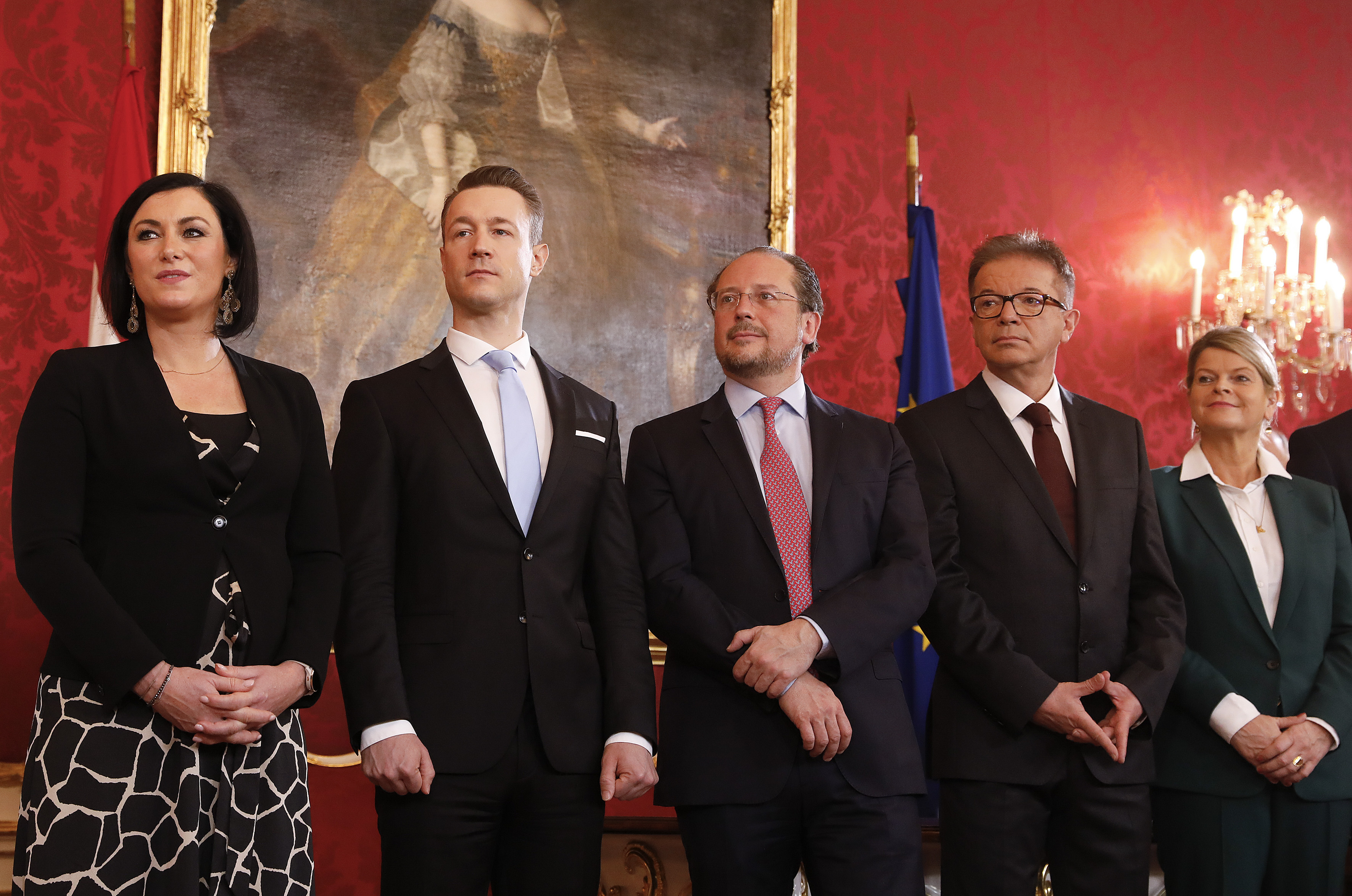
Inauguration of the second Kurz government on 7 January 2020.

After the 2019 Austrian legislative election, Kurz and Werner Kogler negotiated a turquoise–green coalition. On 1 January 2020, they announced together that they had reached an agreement. On 4 January 2020, the Green Party's federal congress voted 93.18 percent in favour of the party's first participation in government. The second Kurz government was sworn in as a turquoise–green coalition on 7 January. This government coalition was continued from 11 October 2021, after Sebastian Kurz's resignation as Federal Chancellor, under his successors Alexander Schallenberg as the Schallenberg federal government and Karl Nehammer as the Nehammer federal government.

=== State level ===
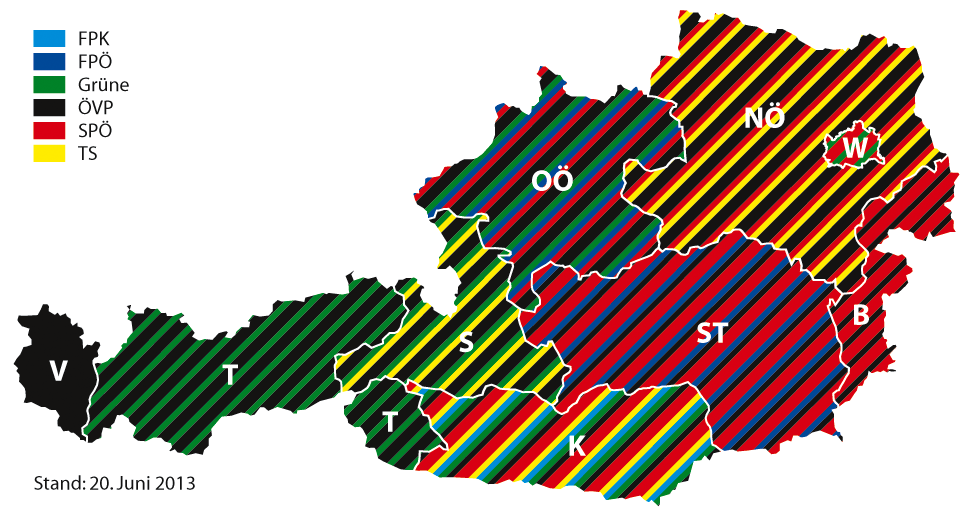
Governing parties 2013

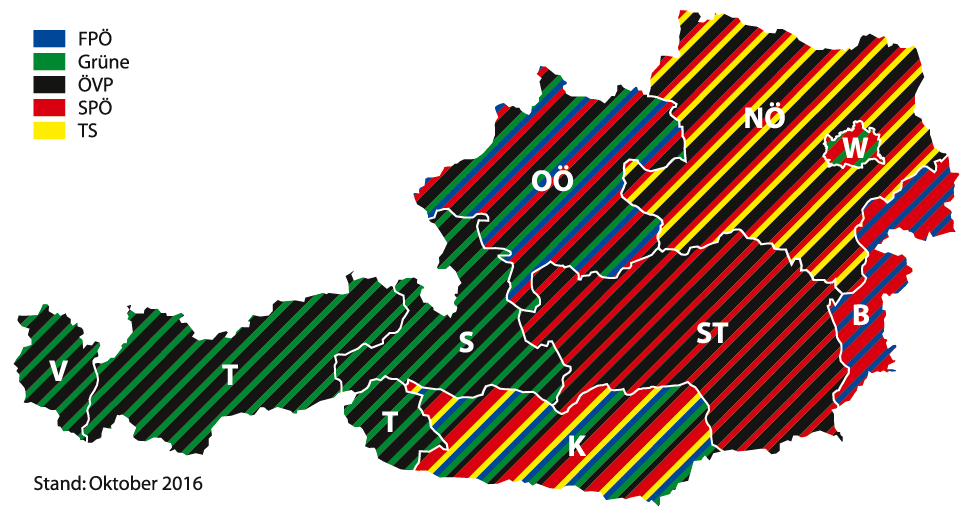
Governing parties 2016

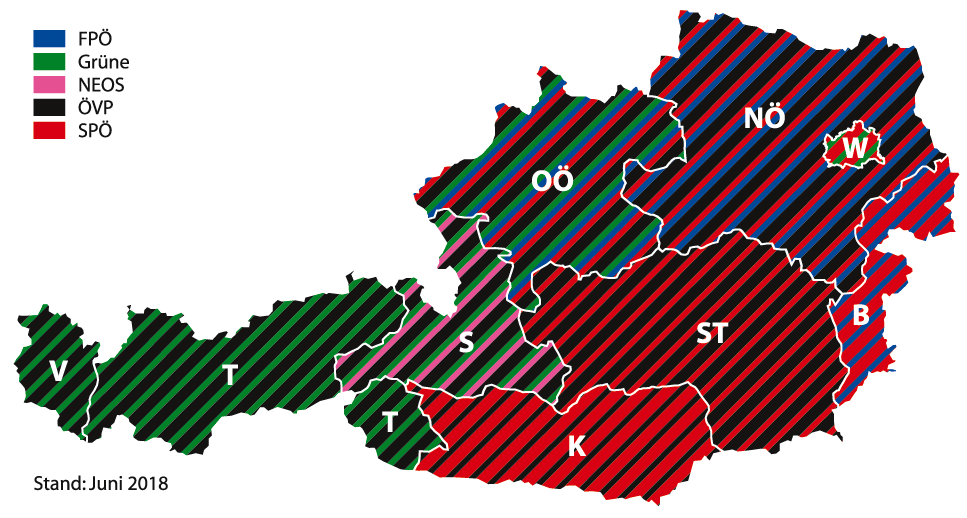
Governing parties 2018

The Greens' first participation in government at the state level occurred after the 1994 Tyrolean state election. Here, Eva Lichtenberger (for the Green Alternative Tyrol GAT) worked under ÖVP state governor Wendelin Weingartner(Second Weingartner government) until 1999. However, since up until then the proportional representation system was still used, this was not a coalition in the true sense of the term. When the coalition system was changed to in 1999, the Greens were no longer represented in the government, despite receiving roughly the same share of the vote.

After the 2003 Upper Austrian state election, a government cooperation based on a coalition agreement (Third Pühringer government) between the black and the green parties was formed at the state level, the first of its kind at the sub-national level in Europe. On the occasion of the three-year anniversary, both the ÖVP and the Greens praised the cooperation. After the 2009 Upper Austrian state election, in which both parties were able to increase their share of the vote, the coalition was continued. After the 2015 Upper Austrian state election, a continuation of the government cooperation was not possible. Due to heavy losses for the ÖVP and only slight gains for the Greens, the two parties together continued to have a majority in the state government composed according to the proportional representation system, but no longer in the Landtag of Upper Austria. As a result, the ÖVP and the Freedom Party of Austria (FPÖ) cooperated instead.

The 2013 Tyrolean state election brought about a black–green coalition, governed by Governor Günther Platter (ÖVP) and Ingrid Felipe (Greens). The cooperation continued after the state election in 2018. After losing the majority in the 2022 election, a black–red coalition was formed.

From the 2014 Vorarlberg state election until the state elections in Vorarlberg in 2024, the black–green coalition also governed there. After that, the cooperation was no longer continued, although a majority of seats would still have existed.

In Salzburg, there was cooperation between the ÖVP and the Greens from 2013 to 2023, initially as part of a black–green–yellow coalition with Team Stronach. Between 2018 and 2023, a black–green–pink alliance governed (including the NEOS). In 2023, the coalition lost its majority of seats, and the NEOS no longer reached the 5% hurdle.

The Greens were also represented in the state government in Carinthia from 2013 to 2018. A red–black–green coalition was formed under Governor Peter Kaiser.

=== Local level ===
Black–green coalitions govern in several larger and smaller cities in Austria, including Bregenz, Klosterneuburg, Mödling, Baden bei Wien and, from 2008 to 2012, Graz.

== Government coalitions of conservative and green parties in other countries ==
In the Czech Republic, a coalition (second government of Mirek Topolánek) consisting of the conservative Civic Democratic Party, the Christian Democratic KDU-ČSL and the Green Party governed from the beginning of 2007 to the spring of 2009.

In Ireland, the Green Party governed from June 2007 together with the liberal conservative-populist party Fianna Fáil and the liberal Progressive Democrats. In the 2011 Irish general election, it lost all its seats, while Fianna Fáil did not become the strongest party for the first time since 1932, losing 51 of its 71 seats. The Irish economic crisis was mainly blamed for the poor performance of the governing parties. The Christian Democratic Fine Gael and the social democratic Irish Labour Party then formed a government. After the 2020 Irish general election, a coalition was formed between Fianna Fáil, Fine Gael and the Green Party, in which – within the framework of the Israeli model – first Micheál Martin and then (again) Leo Varadkar served as Taoiseach. After the 2024 Irish general election, the Greens lost all but one of the seats, and left the government.

In Finland, an alliance of the Centre Party, the National Coalition Party, the Green League and the Swedish People's Party of Finland governed from 2007 to 2011.

== See also ==
- Green conservatism
