= 2009 Upper Austrian state election =

← 2003	27 September 2009	2015 →

All 56 seats in the Landtag of Upper Austria 29 seats needed for a majority All 9 seats in the state government
- Turnout: 872,796 (80.3%) ▲1.7%
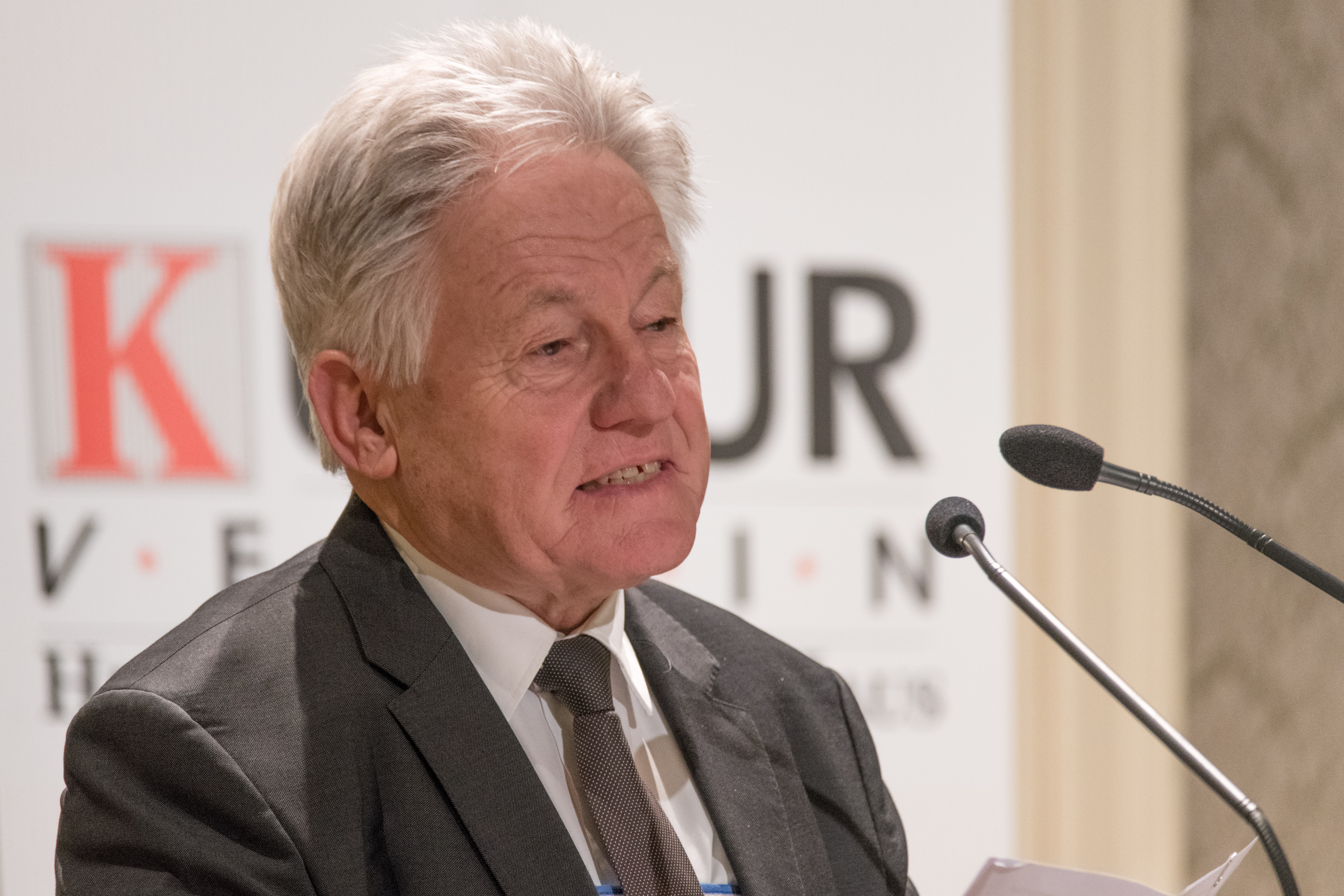

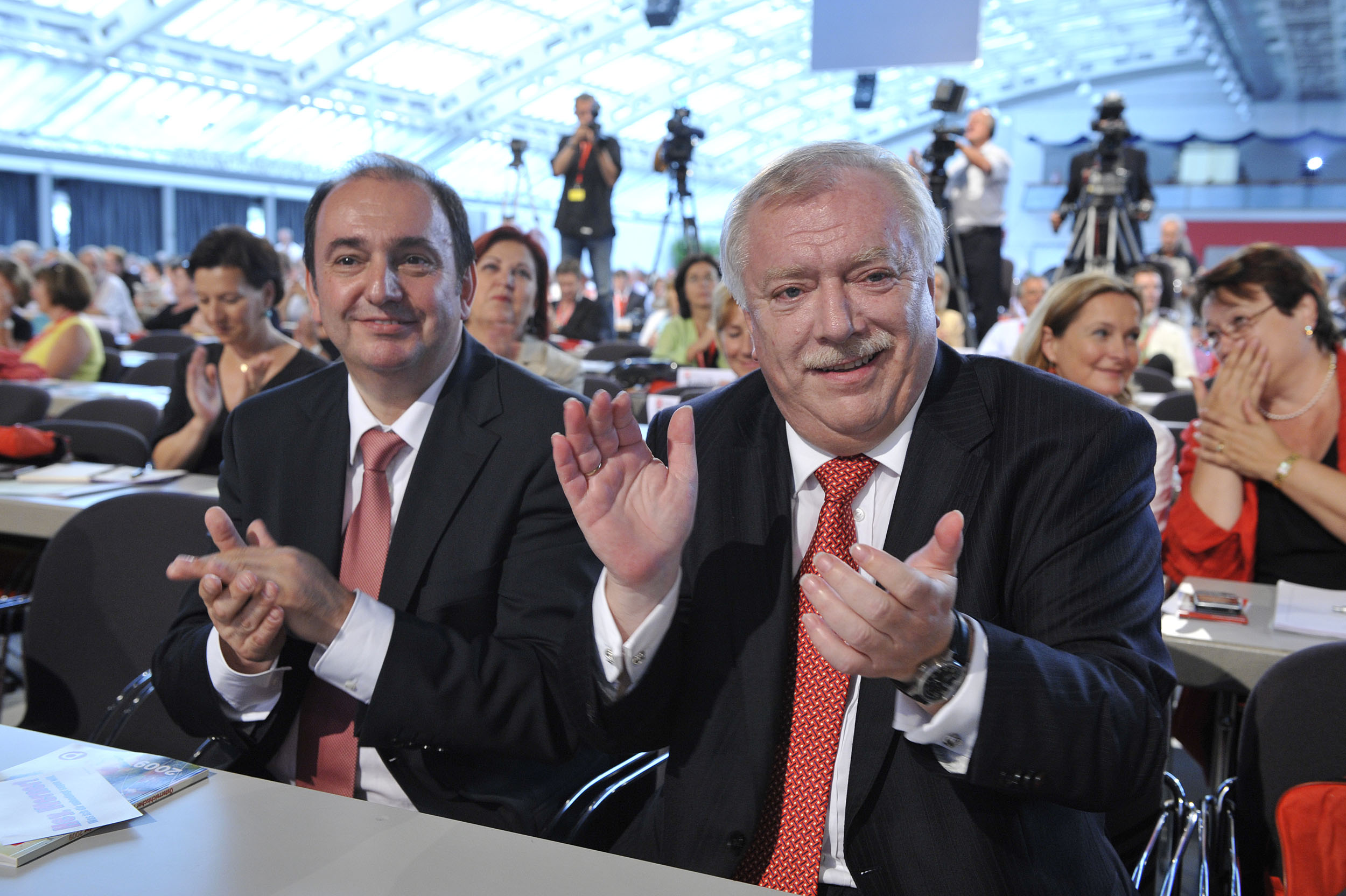

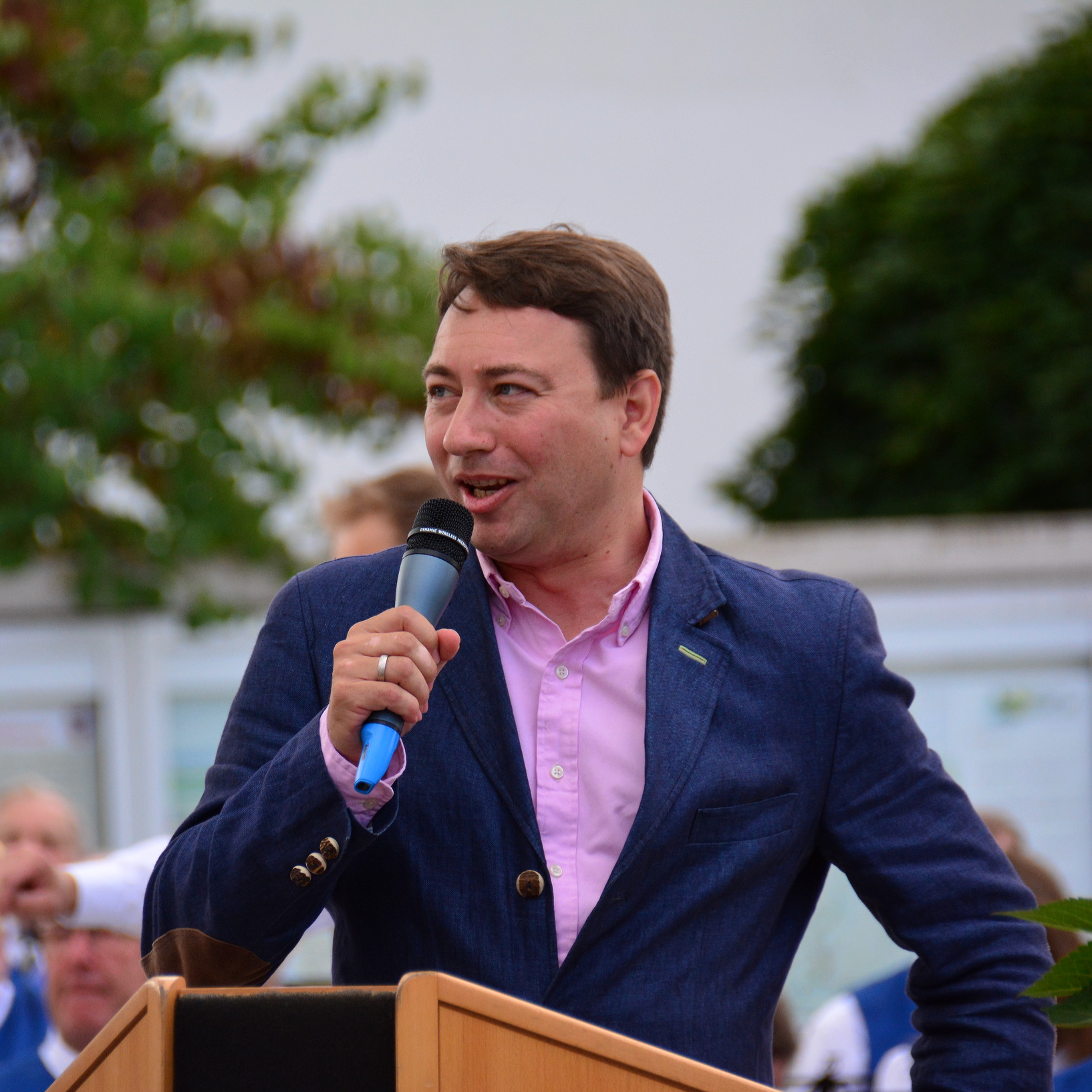

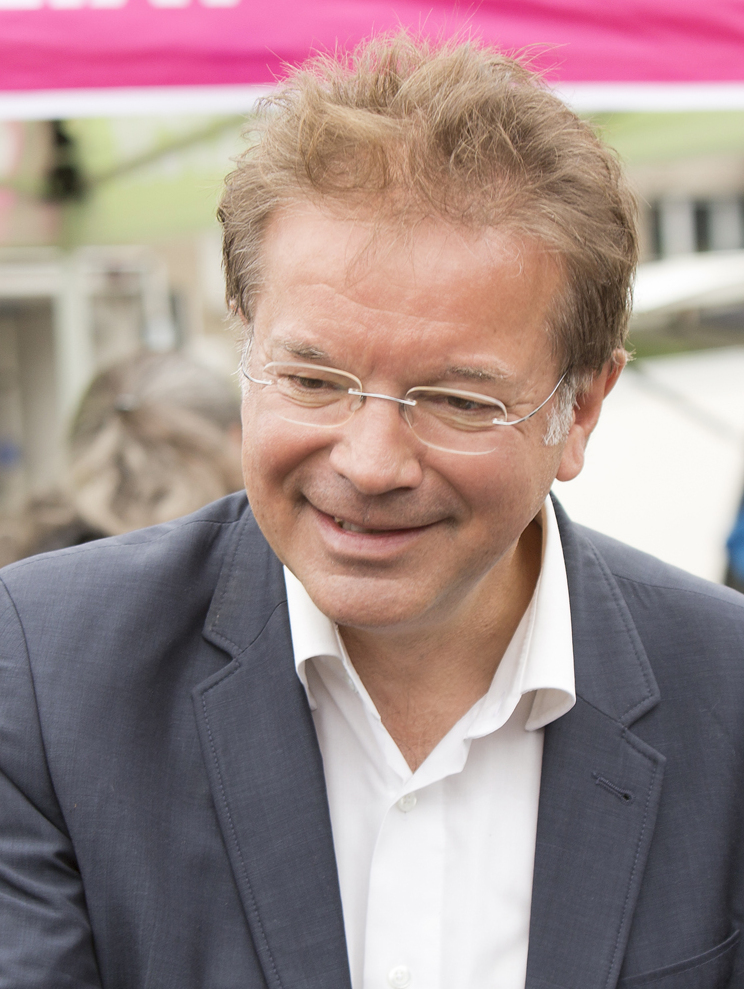
	First party	Second party
Leader	Josef Pühringer	Erich Haider
Party	ÖVP	SPÖ
Last election	25 seats, 43.4%	22 seats, 38.3%
Seats won	28	14
Seat change	▲3	▼8
Popular vote	400,365	213,555
Percentage	46.8%	24.9%
Swing	▲3.3%	▼13.4%
	Third party	Fourth party
Leader	Manfred Haimbuchner	Rudolf Anschober
Party	FPÖ	Greens
Last election	4 seats, 8.4%	5 seats, 9.1%
Seats won	9	5
Seat change	▲5	0
Popular vote	130,937	78,569
Percentage	15.3%	9.2%
Swing	▲6.9%	▲0.1%
Governor before election
Josef Pühringer
ÖVP
Elected Governor
Josef Pühringer
ÖVP

The 2009 Upper Austrian state election was held on 27 September 2009 to elect the members of the Landtag of Upper Austria.

The Austrian People's Party (ÖVP) made gains but fell just short of an overall majority. The Social Democratic Party of Austria (SPÖ) suffered major losses, falling to just under a quarter of the vote, while the Freedom Party of Austria (FPÖ) recovered some of the losses they had taken in the 2003 election. The ÖVP under Governor Josef Pühringer subsequently renewed its working agreement with the Greens which had been signed after the previous election.

== Background ==
The Upper Austrian constitution mandates that cabinet positions in the state government (state councillors, German: Landesräten) be allocated between parties proportionally in accordance with the share of votes won by each; this is known as Proporz. As such, the government is a perpetual coalition of all parties that qualify for at least one state councillor. Despite this, parties still establish formal coalitions to organise cabinet positions and ensure a Landtag majority for legislative purposes.

In the 2003 state election, the ÖVP maintained a small lead over the SPÖ, which achieved a strong swing in its favour while the FPÖ's support collapsed. The Greens achieved a respectable result of 9%, and crucially achieved balance of power in the state government. The ÖVP and SPÖ each won four councillors, while the Greens won one; the FPÖ failed to win any. The ÖVP signed a working coalition with the Greens, giving rise to the first ÖVP–Green government in Austria.

== Electoral system ==
The 56 seats of the Landtag of Upper Austria are elected via open list proportional representation in a two-step process. The seats are distributed between five multi-member constituencies. For parties to receive any representation in the Landtag, they must either win at least one seat in a constituency directly, or clear a 4 percent state-wide electoral threshold. Seats are distributed in constituencies according to the Hare quota, with any remaining seats allocated using the D'Hondt method at the state level, to ensure overall proportionality between a party's vote share and its share of seats.

== Contesting parties ==
The table below lists parties represented in the previous Landtag.

Name		Ideology	Leader	2003 result		
Name		Ideology	Leader	Votes (%)	Seats	Councillors
ÖVP	Austrian People's Party; Österreichische Volkspartei	Christian democracy	Josef Pühringer	43.4%	25 / 56	4 / 9
SPÖ	Social Democratic Party of Austria; Sozialdemokratische Partei Österreichs	Social democracy	Erich Haider	38.3%	22 / 56	4 / 9
GRÜNE	The Greens – The Green Alternative; Die Grünen – Die Grüne Alternative	Green politics	Rudolf Anschober	9.1%	5 / 56	1 / 9
FPÖ	Freedom Party of Austria; Freiheitliche Partei Österreichs	Right-wing populism Euroscepticism	Manfred Haimbuchner	8.4%	4 / 56	0 / 9

In addition to the parties already represented in the Landtag, three parties collected enough signatures to be placed on the ballot.

- Alliance for the Future of Austria (BZÖ)
- Communist Party of Austria (KPÖ)
- The Christians (DC)

== Results ==
Party	Votes	%	+/−	Seats	+/−	Coun.	+/−
Austrian People's Party (ÖVP)	400,365	46.76	+3.34	28	+3	5	+1
Social Democratic Party of Austria (SPÖ)	213,555	24.94	–13.39	14	–8	2	–2
Freedom Party of Austria (FPÖ)	130,937	15.29	+6.89	9	+5	1	+1
The Greens – The Green Alternative (GRÜNE)	78,569	9.18	+0.12	5	±0	1	±0
Alliance for the Future of Austria (BZÖ)	24,268	2.83	New	0	New	0	New
Communist Party of Austria (KPÖ)	4,812	0.56	–0.22	0	±0	0	±0
The Christians (DC)	3,721	0.43	New	0	New	0	New
Invalid/blank votes	16,569	–	–	–	–	–	–
Total	872,796	100	–	56	0	9	0
Registered voters/turnout	1,086,310	80.35	+1.70	–	–	–	–
Source: Upper Austrian Government

Popular vote
ÖVP	46.76%
SPÖ	24.94%
FPÖ	15.29%
GRÜNE	9.18%
Other	3.82%

Landtag seats
ÖVP	50.00%
SPÖ	25.00%
FPÖ	16.07%
GRÜNE	8.93%

=== Results by constituency ===
Constituency	ÖVP		SPÖ		FPÖ		Grüne		Others	Total seats	Turnout
Constituency	%	S	%	S	%	S	%	S	%	Total seats	Turnout
Linz and Surrounds	38.6	4	31.2	3	15.1	1	11.4	1	3.8	9	74.0
Innviertel	50.6	4	19.6	1	18.9	1	7.0		4.0	6	81.1
Hausruckviertel	47.0	6	22.9	3	17.5	2	9.0	1	3.8	12	81.0
Traunviertel	45.6	4	27.8	2	13.4	1	8.8		4.5	7	80.1
Mühlviertel	52.7	6	22.7	2	12.0	1	9.2	1	3.5	10	86.6
Remaining seats		4		3		3		2		12	
Total	46.8	28	24.9	14	15.3	9	9.2	5	3.8	56	80.3
Source: Upper Austrian Government
