= 2015 Upper Austrian state election =

← 2009	27 September 2015	2021 →

All 56 seats in the Landtag of Upper Austria 29 seats needed for a majority All 9 seats in the state government
- Turnout: 893,485 (81.6%) ▲1.3%
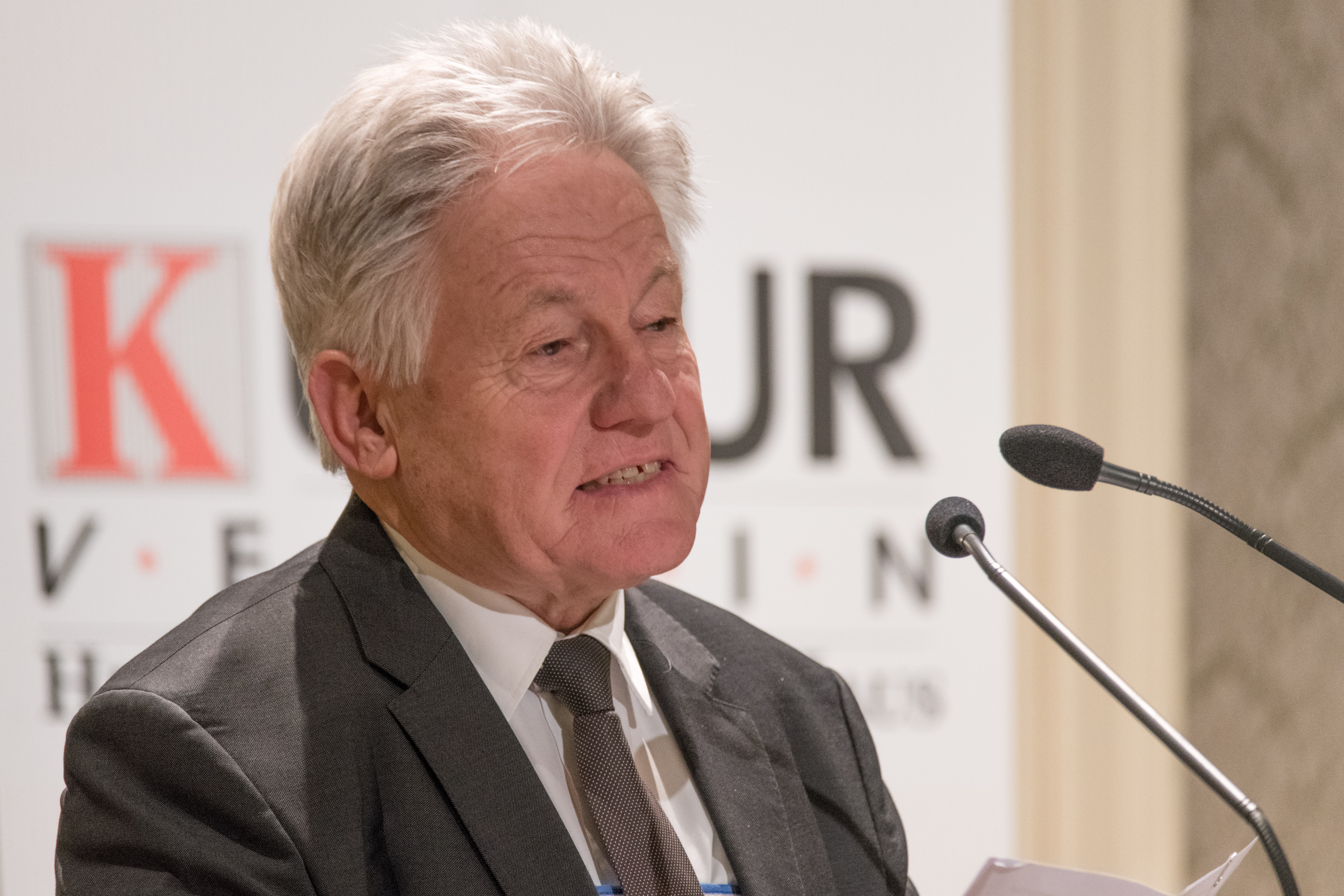

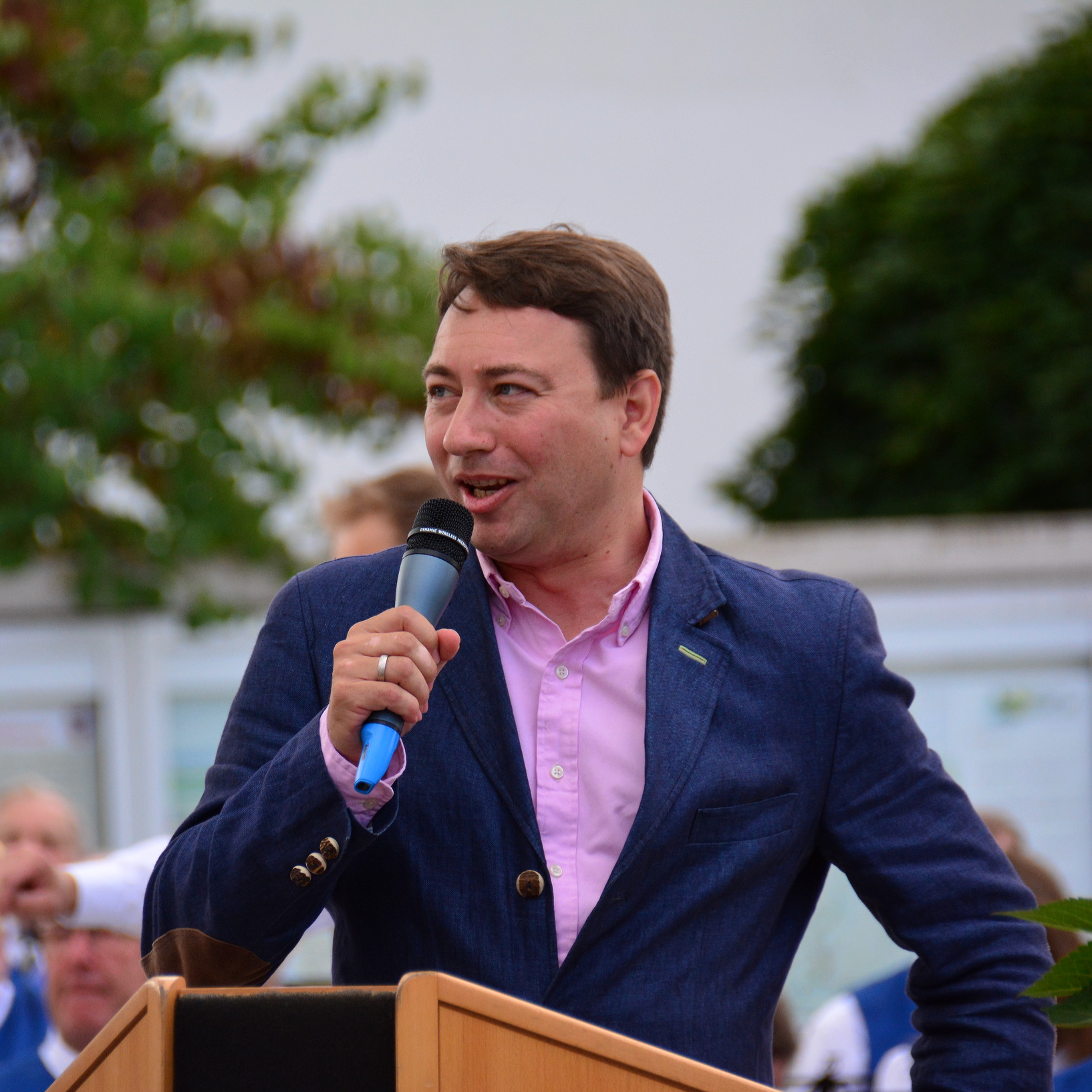

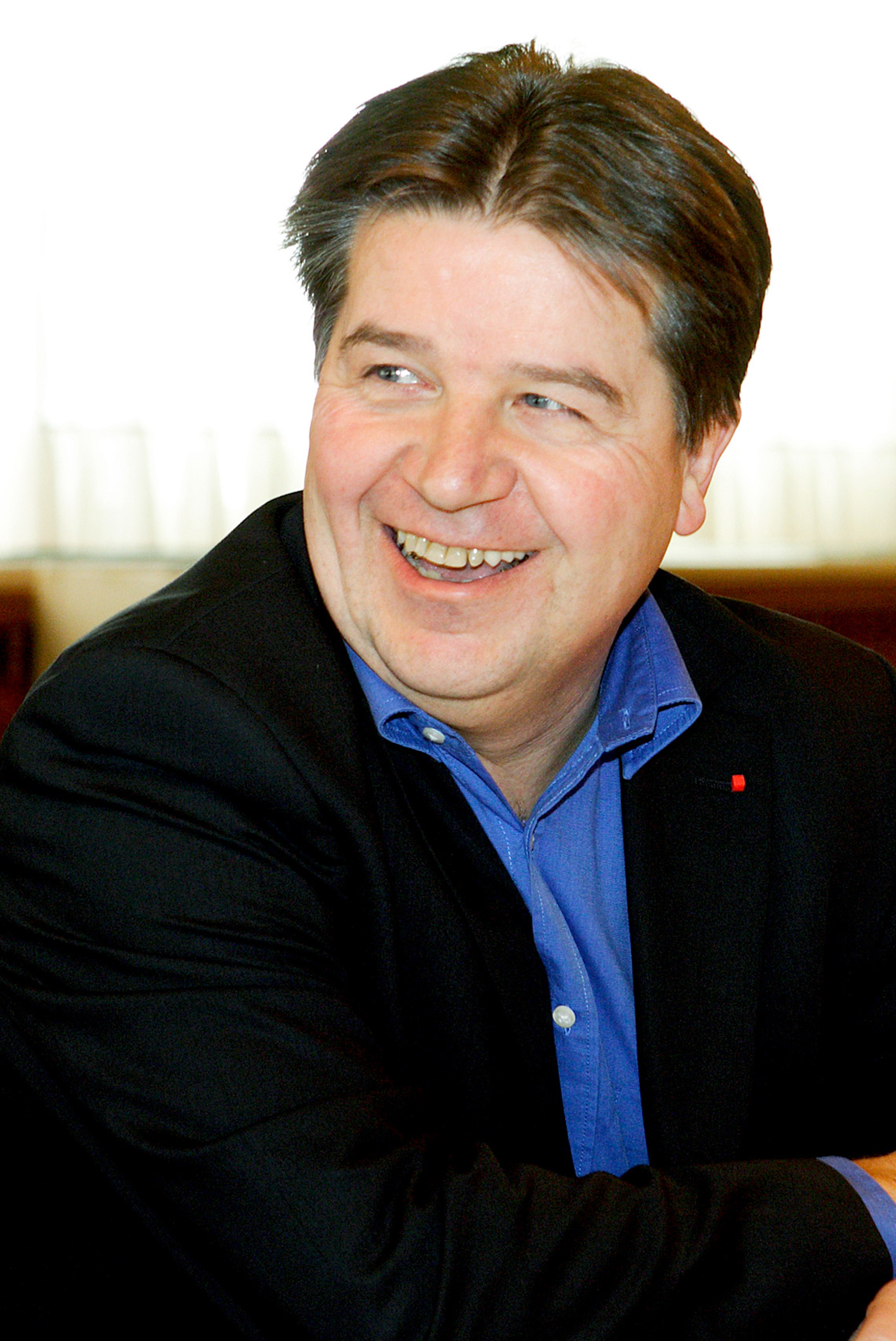

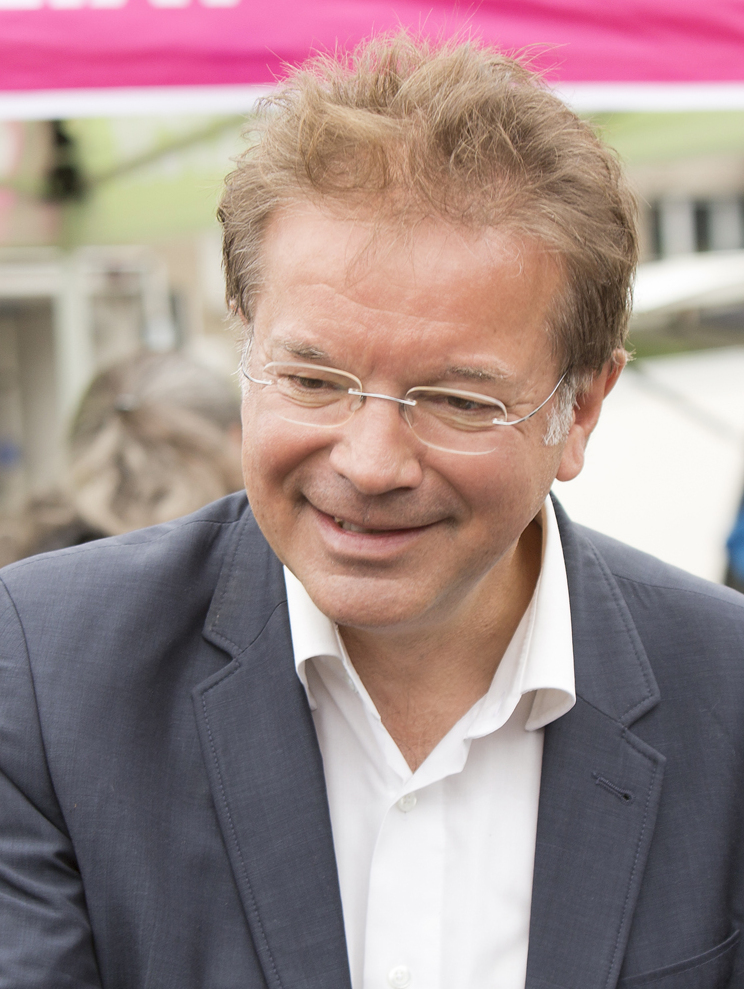
	First party	Second party
Leader	Josef Pühringer	Manfred Haimbuchner
Party	ÖVP	FPÖ
Last election	28 seats, 46.8%	9 seats, 15.3%
Seats won	21	18
Seat change	▼7	▲9
Popular vote	316,290	263,985
Percentage	36.4%	30.4%
Swing	▼10.4%	▲15.1%
	Third party	Fourth party
Leader	Reinhold Entholzer	Rudolf Anschober
Party	SPÖ	Greens
Last election	14 seats, 24.9%	5 seats, 9.2%
Seats won	11	6
Seat change	▼3	▲1
Popular vote	159,753	89,703
Percentage	18.4%	10.3%
Swing	▼6.6%	▲1.1%
- Results by municipality. The lighter shade indicates a plurality; the darker shade indicates a majority.
Governor before election
Josef Pühringer
ÖVP
Elected Governor
Josef Pühringer
ÖVP

The 2015 Upper Austrian state election was held on 27 September 2015 to elect the members of the Landtag of Upper Austria.

The election saw major losses for the Austrian People's Party (ÖVP) and Social Democratic Party of Austria (SPÖ), the traditional major parties of Austrian politics. This was matched by huge gains for the right-wing populist Freedom Party of Austria (FPÖ), which doubled its vote share to 30% and overtook the SPÖ to become the second largest party. The Greens also made small gains, while the liberal NEOS – The New Austria (NEOS) failed to enter the Landtag on its first attempt, taking 3.5%.

== Background ==
The Upper Austrian constitution mandates that cabinet positions in the state government (state councillors, German: Landesräten) be allocated between parties proportionally in accordance with the share of votes won by each; this is known as Proporz. As such, the government is a perpetual coalition of all parties that qualify for at least one state councillor. Despite this, parties still establish formal coalitions to organise cabinet positions and ensure a Landtag majority for legislative purposes.

In the 2009 state election, the ÖVP consolidated its lead over the SPÖ, which suffered a huge loss of 13.4 percentage points. Meanwhile, the ÖVP came up one seat short of an absolute majority. The FPÖ also made substantial gains (6.9 points) and moved into third place ahead of the Greens. The ÖVP won five councillors, the SPÖ two, the FPÖ one, and the Greens one. The ÖVP formed a coalition with the Greens.

== Electoral system ==
The 56 seats of the Landtag of Upper Austria are elected via open list proportional representation in a two-step process. The seats are distributed between five multi-member constituencies. For parties to receive any representation in the Landtag, they must either win at least one seat in a constituency directly, or clear a 4 percent state-wide electoral threshold. Seats are distributed in constituencies according to the Hare quota, with any remaining seats allocated using the D'Hondt method at the state level, to ensure overall proportionality between a party's vote share and its share of seats.

== Contesting parties ==
The table below lists parties represented in the previous Landtag.

Name		Ideology	Leader	2009 result		
Name		Ideology	Leader	Votes (%)	Seats	Councillors
ÖVP	Austrian People's Party; Österreichische Volkspartei	Christian democracy	Josef Pühringer	46.8%	28 / 56	5 / 9
SPÖ	Social Democratic Party of Austria; Sozialdemokratische Partei Österreichs	Social democracy	Reinhold Entholzer	24.9%	14 / 56	2 / 9
FPÖ	Freedom Party of Austria; Freiheitliche Partei Österreichs	Right-wing populism Euroscepticism	Manfred Haimbuchner	15.3%	9 / 56	1 / 9
GRÜNE	The Greens – The Green Alternative; Die Grünen – Die Grüne Alternative	Green politics	Rudolf Anschober	9.2%	5 / 56	1 / 9

In addition to the parties already represented in the Landtag, three parties collected enough signatures to be placed on the ballot.

- NEOS – The New Austria (NEOS)
- Communist Party of Austria (KPÖ)
- Christian Party of Austria (CPÖ)

== Results ==
Party	Votes	%	+/−	Seats	+/−	Coun.	+/−
Austrian People's Party (ÖVP)	315,290	36.37	–10.39	21	–7	4	–1
Freedom Party of Austria (FPÖ)	263,985	30.36	+15.07	18	+9	3	+2
Social Democratic Party of Austria (SPÖ)	159,753	18.37	–6.57	11	–3	1	–1
The Greens – The Green Alternative (GRÜNE)	89,703	10.32	+1.14	6	+1	1	±0
NEOS – The New Austria (NEOS)	30,201	3.47	New	0	New	0	New
Communist Party of Austria (KPÖ)	6,512	0.75	+0.19	0	±0	0	±0
Christian Party of Austria (CPÖ)	3,111	0.36	New	0	New	0	New
Invalid/blank votes	23,930	–	–	–	–	–	–
Total	893,485	100	–	56	0	9	0
Registered voters/turnout	1,094,497	81.63	+1.28	–	–	–	–
Source: ORF

Popular vote
ÖVP	36.37%
FPÖ	30.36%
SPÖ	18.37%
GRÜNE	10.32%
NEOS	3.47%
Other	1.11%

Landtag seats
ÖVP	37.50%
FPÖ	32.14%
SPÖ	19.64%
GRÜNE	10.71%

=== Results by constituency ===
Constituency	ÖVP		FPÖ		SPÖ		Grüne		NEOS		Others	Total seats	Turnout
Constituency	%	S	%	S	%	S	%	S	%	S	%	Total seats	Turnout
Linz and Surrounds	30.8	3	27.8	3	22.8	2	12.9	1	4.2		1.4	9	75.9
Innviertel	36.1	3	37.4	3	14.8	1	7.8		3.0		0.9	7	81.9
Hausruckviertel	36.3	5	32.9	4	16.9	2	9.8	1	3.1		1.0	12	83.0
Traunviertel	35.6	3	29.3	3	20.6	2	10.0	1	3.4		1.3	9	81.2
Mühlviertel	42.8	4	25.7	2	16.5	1	10.4	1	3.5		1.1	8	86.7
Remaining seats		3		3		3		2		0		11	
Total	36.4	21	30.4	18	18.4	11	10.3	6	3.5	0	1.1	56	81.6
Source: Upper Austrian Government

== Aftermath ==
The result was a major breakthrough for the FPÖ, not least of all because the party captured three state councillors. This put pressure on the ÖVP, which no longer held a majority in the state government. They declared they were not willing to form a coalition which would only have a one-seat majority in the state government, essentially ruling out any coalition with either the SPÖ or Greens alone. The Greens pushed for a three-party coalition with the ÖVP and SPÖ, but Pühringer instead sought an agreement with the FPÖ. This was ultimately successful, though Pühringer distanced himself from the FPÖ, describing the situation as a "working agreement" rather than a coalition, stating that both parties were given great freedom to operate independently. The coalition was condemned by SPÖ federal Chancellor Werner Faymann, but supported by ÖVP Vice Chancellor Reinhold Mitterlehner. The new government took office on 23 October.
