= Manfred Haimbuchner =

Austrian politician (born 1978)

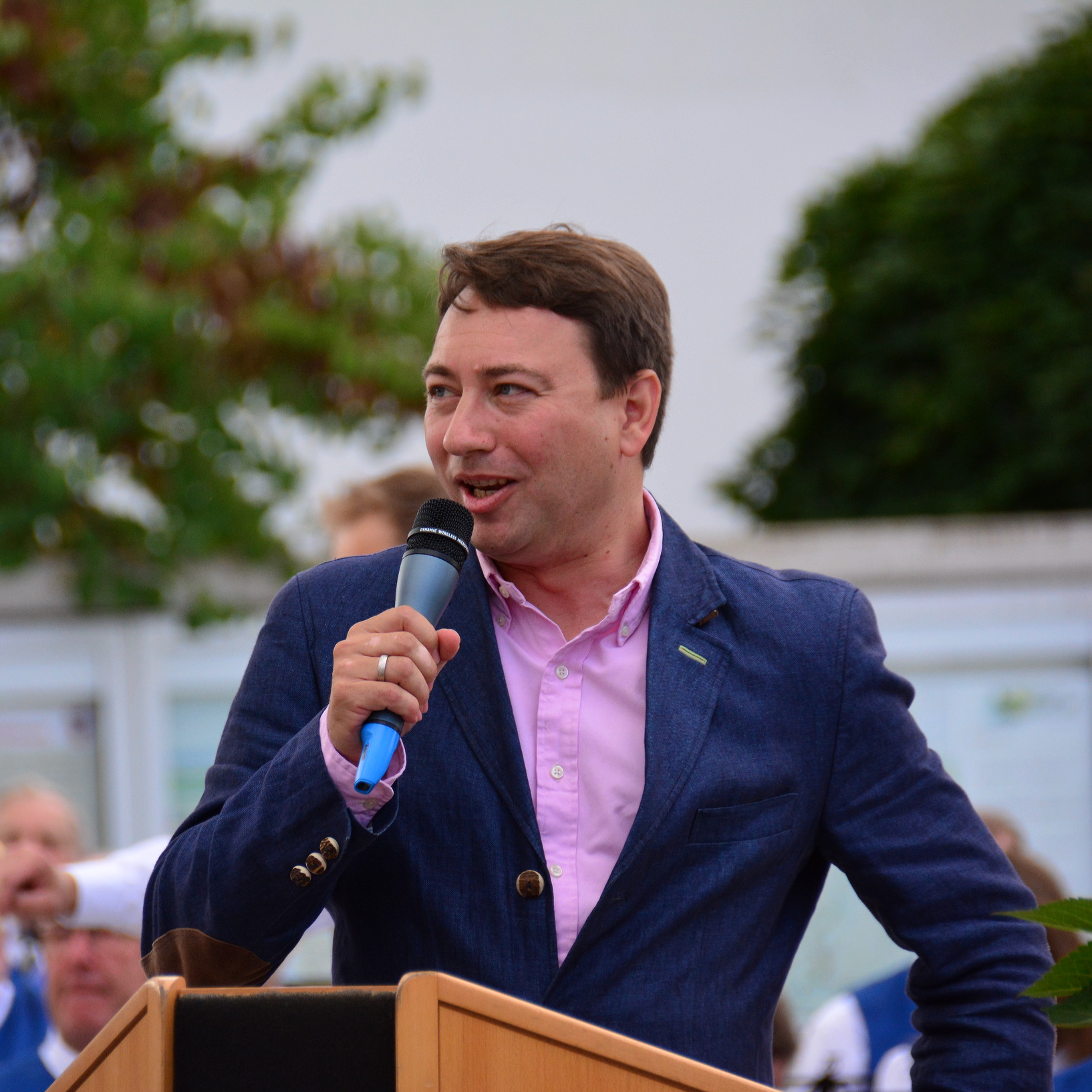
Haimbuchner in 2017

Manfred Haimbuchner (born 12 August 1978) is a Freedom Party of Austria (FPÖ) politician. He served in the National Council from 2006 to 2009, and in the Landtag of Upper Austria as his party's leader since 2009. In 2015, he became Deputy Governor of the state.

== Biography ==
Haimbuchner is the descendant of refugee Sudeten Germans. His father Lambert Haimbuchner was the mayor of Steinhaus. He graduated in Law from Johannes Kepler University Linz. He married Annette in May 2016, and their son was born in January 2018.

In the 2006 elections, he was elected to the National Council. He was the FPÖ's lead candidate in the 2009 Upper Austrian state election, and was named minister for Housing, Nature and Savings in Josef Pühringer's state government.

During the campaign for the 2015 Upper Austrian state election, he spoke out against settling Syrian refugees in the state during the European migrant crisis. His party's vote share doubled to 30.4% to make them the second power in the state after the Austrian People's Party (ÖVP); Reuters credited this to the migrant crisis. He was then made Deputy Governor to Pühringer.

Haimbuchner was the recipient of the 2016 Black Globe Award given out by Greenpeace, the WWF and Global 2000 to figures who deny climate change. He welcomed the award as recognition for "common-sense politics".

In March 2021, Hambuchner was in intensive care with COVID-19. He was later fined for having broken rules by attending a welcoming party for a newborn. That September, his party's seats dropped to 11 in the state elections, joint second with the Social Democratic Party of Austria (SPÖ).
