= 2003 Upper Austrian state election =

← 1997	28 September 2003	2009 →

All 56 seats in the Landtag of Upper Austria 29 seats needed for a majority All 9 seats in the state government
- Turnout: 801,889 (78.7%) ▼2.4%
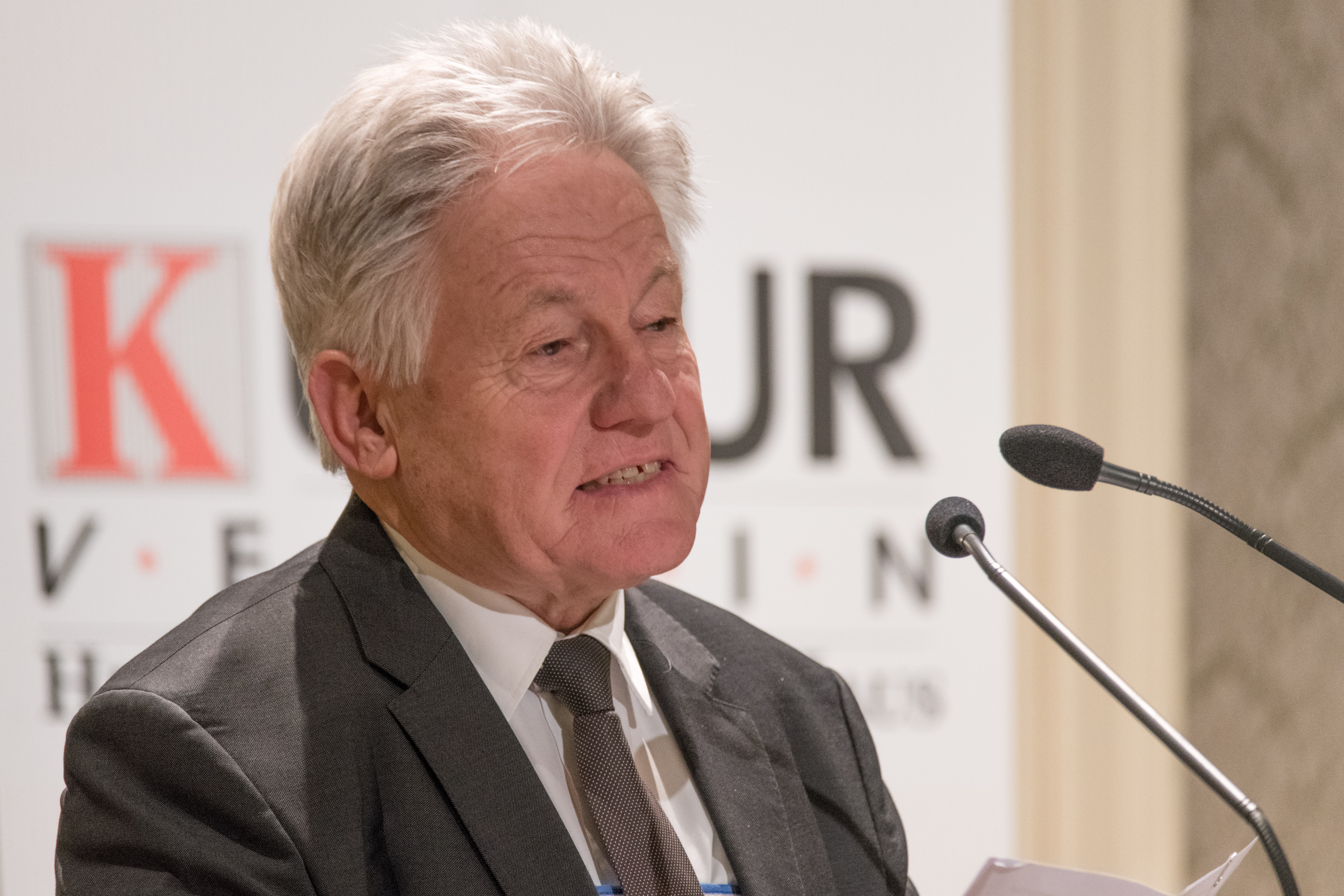

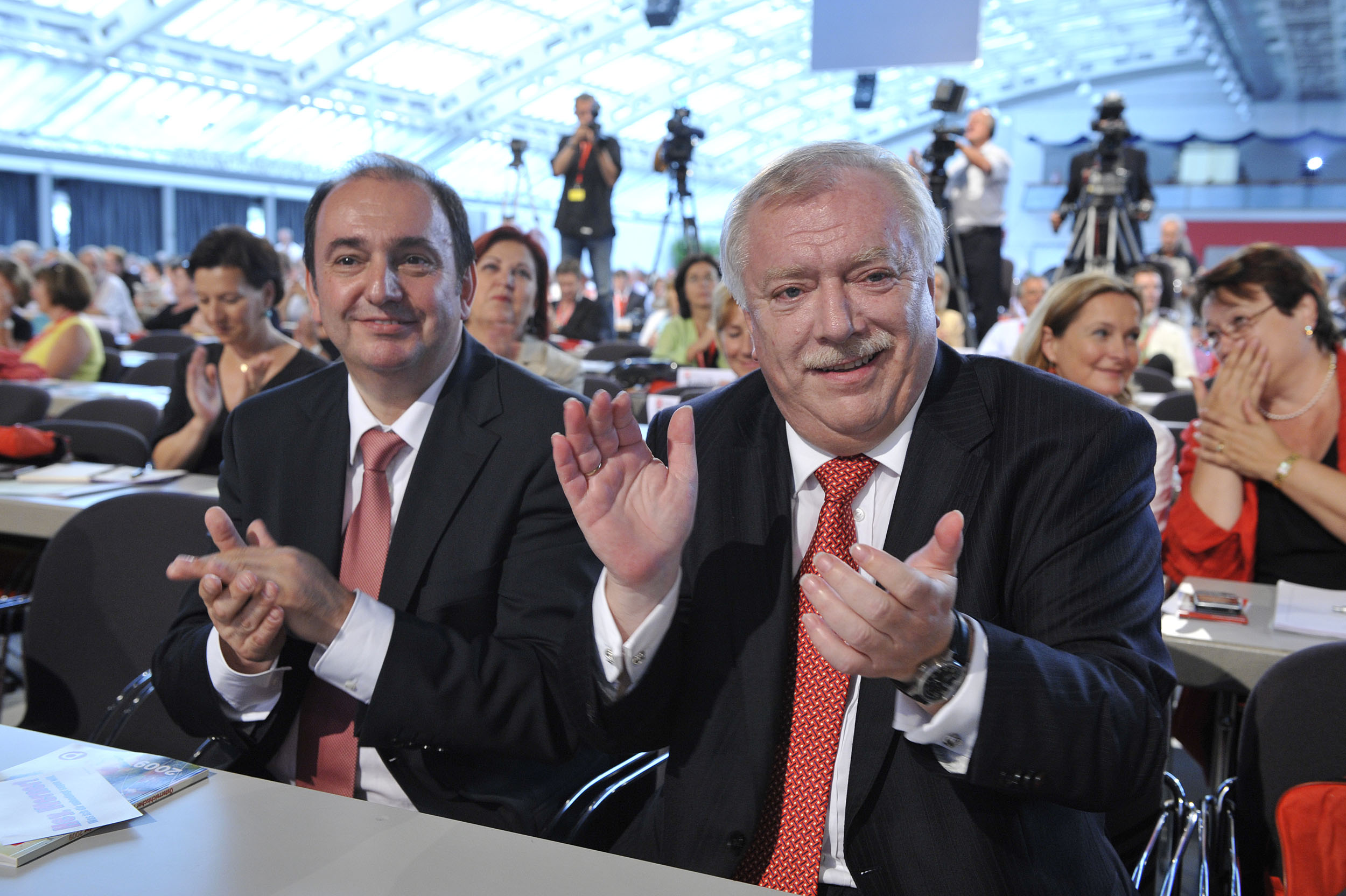

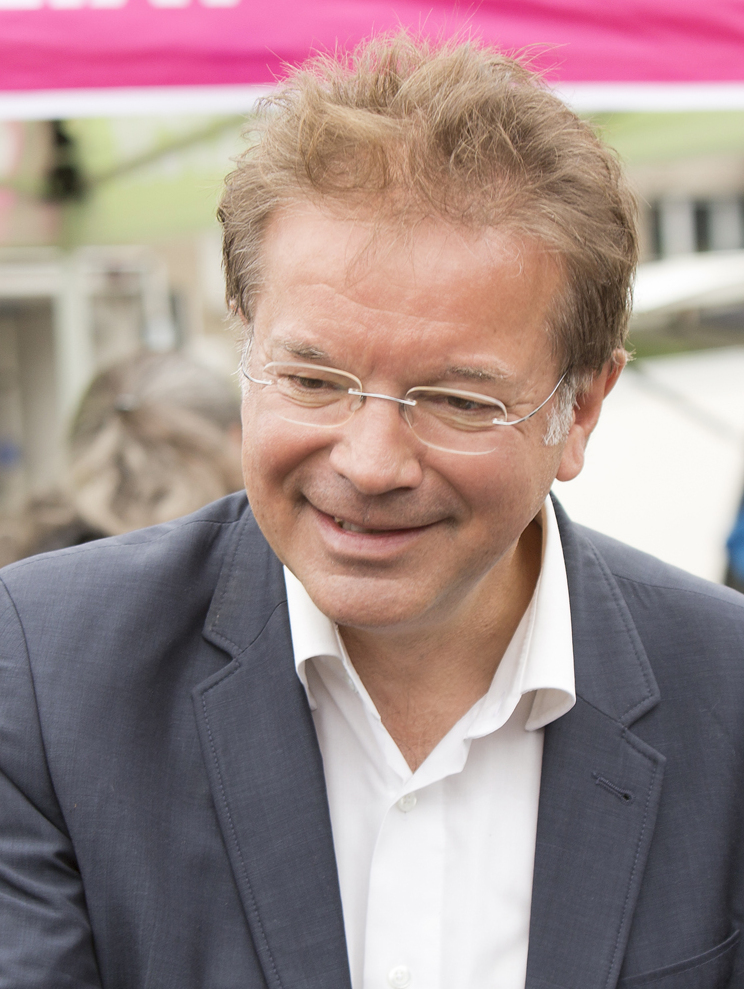
	First party	Second party
Leader	Josef Pühringer	Erich Haider
Party	ÖVP	SPÖ
Last election	25 seats, 42.7%	16 seats, 27.0%
Seats won	25	22
Seat change	0	▲6
Popular vote	339,179	299,402
Percentage	43.4%	38.3%
Swing	▲0.7%	▲11.3%
	Third party	Fourth party
Leader	Rudolf Anschober
Party	Greens	FPÖ
Last election	3 seats, 5.8%	12 seats, 20.6%
Seats won	5	4
Seat change	▲2	▼8
Popular vote	70,742	65,643
Percentage	9.1%	8.4%
Swing	▲3.3%	▼12.2%
Governor before election
Josef Pühringer
ÖVP
Elected Governor
Josef Pühringer
ÖVP

The 2003 Upper Austrian state election was held on 28 September 2003 to elect the members of the Landtag of Upper Austria.

The governing Austrian People's Party (ÖVP) remained the largest party in the face of a strong performance from the Social Democratic Party of Austria (SPÖ). The Freedom Party of Austria (FPÖ), which had won over 20% in the previous election, lost more than half its vote share and fell to 8%; most of this flowed to the SPÖ. The FPÖ also lost both its state councillors. The Greens became the third largest party and won their first state councillor in Upper Austria. As the ÖVP and SPÖ won four each, the Greens held balance of power in the state government.

The ÖVP under Governor Josef Pühringer signed a working agreement with the Greens. This was the first ever ÖVP–Green coalition formed on a state level.

== Background ==
The Upper Austrian constitution mandates that cabinet positions in the state government (state councillors, German: Landesräten) be allocated between parties proportionally in accordance with the share of votes won by each; this is known as Proporz. As such, the government is a perpetual coalition of all parties that qualify for at least one state councillor. Despite this, parties still establish formal coalitions to organise cabinet positions and ensure a Landtag majority for legislative purposes.

In the 1997 state election, the ÖVP and SPÖ suffered minor losses to the FPÖ and Greens, the latter of which entered the Landtag for the first time. The ÖVP won four state councillors, the SPÖ three, and the FPÖ two.

== Electoral system ==
The 56 seats of the Landtag of Upper Austria are elected via open list proportional representation in a two-step process. The seats are distributed between five multi-member constituencies. For parties to receive any representation in the Landtag, they must either win at least one seat in a constituency directly, or clear a 4 percent state-wide electoral threshold. Seats are distributed in constituencies according to the Hare quota, with any remaining seats allocated using the D'Hondt method at the state level, to ensure overall proportionality between a party's vote share and its share of seats.

== Contesting parties ==
The table below lists parties represented in the previous Landtag.

Name		Ideology	Leader	1997 result		
Name		Ideology	Leader	Votes (%)	Seats	Councillors
ÖVP	Austrian People's Party; Österreichische Volkspartei	Christian democracy	Josef Pühringer	42.7%	25 / 56	4 / 9
SPÖ	Social Democratic Party of Austria; Sozialdemokratische Partei Österreichs	Social democracy	Erich Haider	27.0%	16 / 56	3 / 9
FPÖ	Freedom Party of Austria; Freiheitliche Partei Österreichs	Right-wing populism Euroscepticism	?	20.6%	12 / 56	2 / 9
GRÜNE	The Greens – The Green Alternative; Die Grünen – Die Grüne Alternative	Green politics	Rudolf Anschober	5.8%	3 / 56	

In addition to the parties already represented in the Landtag, one party collected enough signatures to be placed on the ballot.

- Communist Party of Austria (KPÖ)

== Results ==
Party	Votes	%	+/−	Seats	+/−	Coun.	+/−
Austrian People's Party (ÖVP)	339,179	43.42	+0.73	25	±0	4	±0
Social Democratic Party of Austria (SPÖ)	299,402	38.33	+11.30	22	+6	4	+1
The Greens – The Green Alternative (GRÜNE)	70,742	9.06	+3.28	5	+2	1	+1
Freedom Party of Austria (FPÖ)	65,643	8.40	–12.23	4	–8	0	–2
Communist Party of Austria (KPÖ)	6,119	0.78	+0.50	0	±0	0	±0
Invalid/blank votes	20,804	–	–	–	–	–	–
Total	801,889	100	–	56	0	9	0
Registered voters/turnout	1,019,608	78.65	–2.40	–	–	–	–
Source: Upper Austrian Government

Popular vote
ÖVP	43.42%
SPÖ	38.33%
GRÜNE	9.06%
FPÖ	8.40%
KPÖ	0.78%

Landtag seats
ÖVP	44.64%
SPÖ	39.29%
GRÜNE	8.93%
FPÖ	7.14%

=== Results by constituency ===
Constituency	ÖVP		SPÖ		Grüne		FPÖ		KPÖ	Total seats	Turnout
Constituency	%	S	%	S	%	S	%	S	%	Total seats	Turnout
Linz and Surrounds	32.5	3	47.3	5	11.6	1	7.5		1.0	9	71.4
Innviertel	49.2	4	31.2	2	6.6		12.3	1	0.7	7	79.1
Hausruckviertel	44.0	6	36.7	5	9.0	1	9.6	1	0.7	13	79.6
Traunviertel	42.2	4	40.7	4	8.5		7.8		0.8	8	79.4
Mühlviertel	50.5	5	34.4	3	8.9		5.6		0.7	8	84.9
Remaining seats		3		3		3		2		11	
Total	43.4	25	38.3	22	9.1	5	8.4	4	0.8	56	78.7
Source: Upper Austrian Government
