= Christian Party of Austria =

Christian Party of Austria Christliche Partei Österreichs
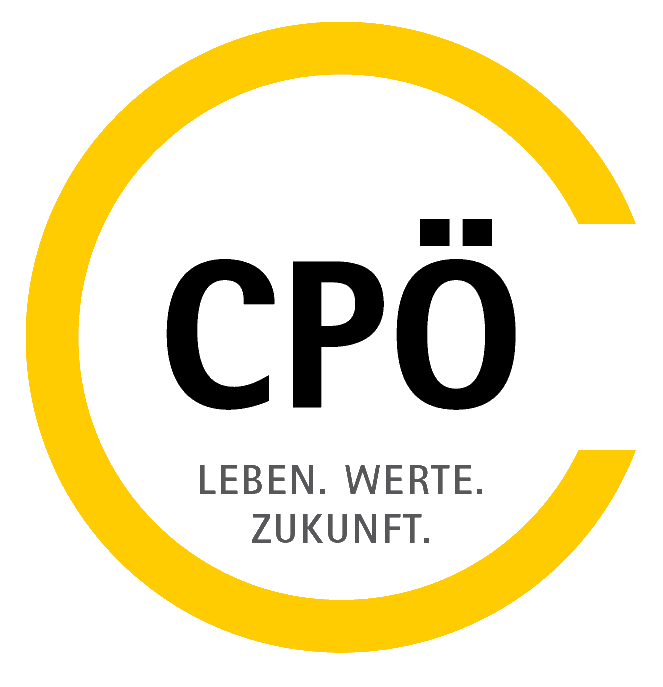
- Leader: Alfred Kuchar
- Founded: 15 October 2005
- Ideology: Christian right; Euroscepticism
- Political position: Right-wing
- Religion: Christian fundamentalism
- European affiliation: European Christian Political Party
- Colours: Yellow
- Slogan: "Life. Values. Future."
- National Council: 0 / 183
- Federal Council: 0 / 62
- European Parliament: 0 / 19

Website
- www.christlicheparteioesterreichs.at

The Christian Party of Austria (German: Christliche Partei Österreichs, CPÖ; formerly the Christians – German: Die Christen) is a minor political party in Austria, founded on 15 October 2005.

It changed its name under its new chairman Rudolf Gehring in late 2009, to avoid the use of the term "Christians" to mean only the party.

== History ==
The party was registered on 23 January 2006, and presented to the public on 27 September 2007, when it announced a popular initiative ("Volksbegehren") on the topic of children and families and that it would contest the 2008 election in Lower Austria.

In the 2008 parliamentary election, the party received 0.64% of the vote.

Rudolf Gehring, the party's chairman, announced he would run for president in the 2010 election. He received 5.44% of the vote for third place, the party's highest vote percentage in a national election to date.

== Goals ==
The party is oriented mainly on Christian politics, advocating, for example:

- Revoking the recognition of same-sex unions
- Giving parents the right to vote for their children
- Maintaining Christian symbols in schools
- Outlawing (or maintaining the illegality of) abortion, euthanasia, stem cell research and artificial insemination
- Protection of the belief in a Creator God, stating that the importance of this belief "demands respect from other creeds and atheists" as well
- A rejection of further EU centralization
- A rejection of illegal immigration

== Election results ==
=== National Council ===
National Council of Austria
Election year	# of total votes	% of overall vote	# of seats	Government
2008	31,080	0.64%	0 / 183	Extra-parliamentary
2013	6,647	0.14%	0 / 183	Extra-parliamentary
2017	425	0.01%	0 / 183	Extra-parliamentary
2019	260	0.00%	0 / 183	Extra-parliamentary

Former Logo

=== President ===
Election	Candidate	First round result			Second round result		
Election	Candidate	Votes	%	Result	Votes	%	Result
2010	Rudolf Gehring	171,668	5.43%	3rd place			
2016	No candidate						
2022	No candidate						

=== State Parliaments ===
State	Year	Votes	%	Seats	±	Government
Burgenland	2015	699	0.38 (#7)	0 / 36	N/A	Extra-parliamentary
Lower Austria	2008	8.537	0.84 (#6)	0 / 56	N/A	Extra-parliamentary
Lower Austria	2013	841	0.09 (#8)	0 / 56	N/A	Extra-parliamentary
Lower Austria	2018	584	0.06 (#6)	0 / 56	N/A	Extra-parliamentary
Salzburg	2018	181	0.07 (#9)	0 / 36	N/A	Extra-parliamentary
Styria	2010	4.762	0.72 (#7)	0 / 56	N/A	Extra-parliamentary
Tyrol	2008	4.699	1.40 (#6)	0 / 36	N/A	Extra-parliamentary
Upper Austria	2009	3.721	0.43 (#7)	0 / 56	N/A	Extra-parliamentary
Upper Austria	2015	3.111	0.36 (#7)	0 / 56	N/A	Extra-parliamentary
Upper Austria	2021	863	0.11 (#9)	0 / 56	N/A	Extra-parliamentary
Vorarlberg	2014	833	0.49 (#7)	0 / 36	N/A	Extra-parliamentary
Vorarlberg	2019	426	0.26 (#11)	0 / 36	N/A	Extra-parliamentary
