= Thomas Stelzer (politician) =

Austrian politician (born 1967)

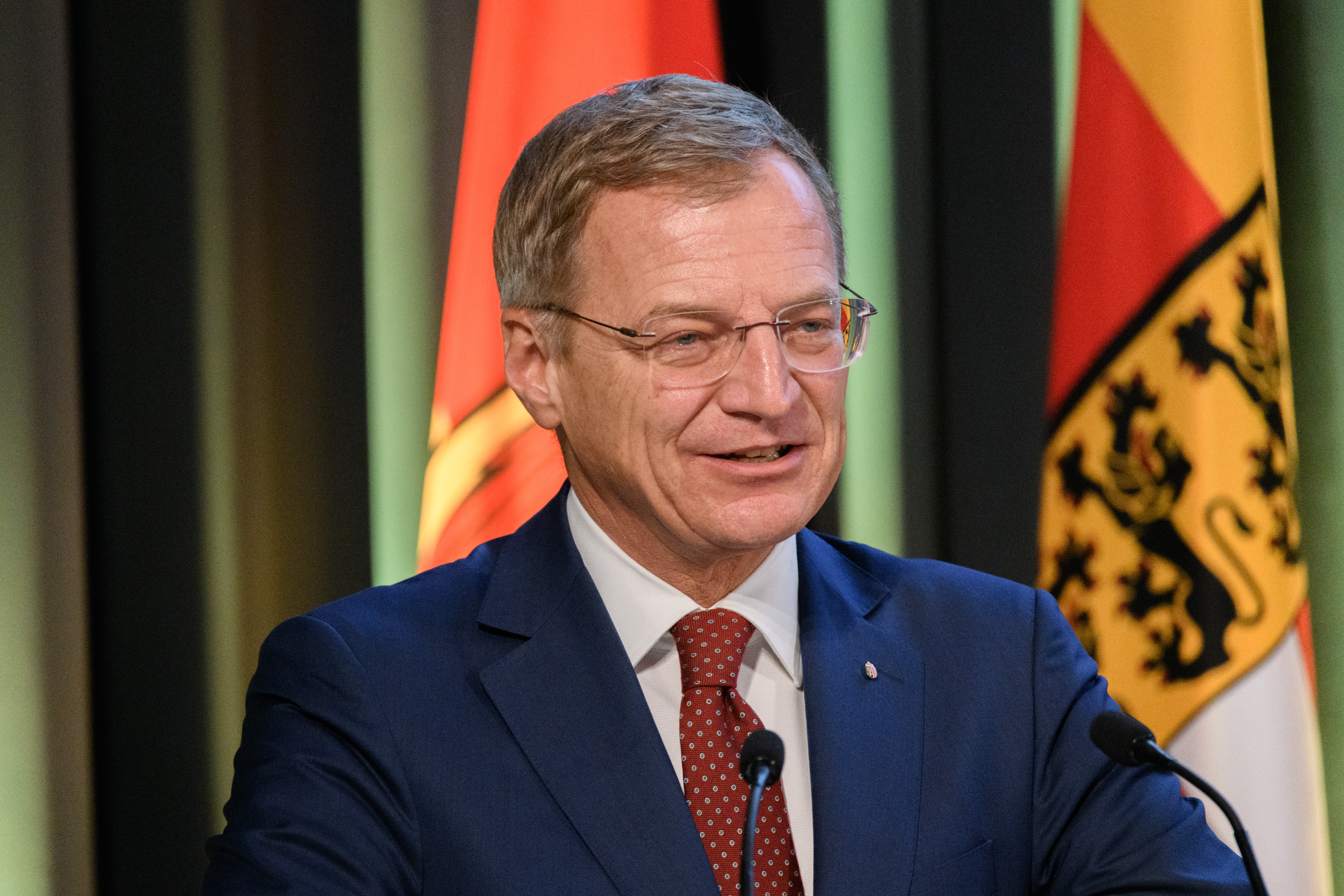

Governor of Upper Austria
- Incumbent
- Assumed office 5 April 2017
- Chancellor: Christian Kern; Sebastian Kurz; Brigitte Bierlein; Sebastian Kurz; Alexander Schallenberg; Karl Nehammer; Alexander Schallenberg (acting); Christian Stocker
- Preceded by: Josef Pühringer

Personal details
- Born: February 21, 1967 (age 59) Linz, Austria
- Party: ÖVP

Military service
- Allegiance: Austria
- Years of service: 1990

Thomas Stelzer (born February 21, 1967, in Linz) is an Austrian politician who is serving as the current Governor of Upper Austria since 2017. Stelzer studied law at the Johannes Kepler University Linz from 1985 to 1990. Before becoming Governor, Stelzer was the Deputy Governor of Upper Austria from 2015 to 2017. He was a member of the Upper Austrian Parliament from 1997 to 2015.

He is Knight of Honor of the Order of St. George.
