= List of governors of Upper Austria =

This is a list of governors of the Austrian state of Upper Austria:

№	Portrait	Name (Born-Died)	Term			Party	Period
№	Portrait	Name (Born-Died)	Took office	Left office	Duration	Party	Period
1		Johann Nepomuk Hauser	4 May 1908	8 February 1927		Christian Social	First Republic (1918–1934)
2		Josef Schlegel	23 February 1927	17 February 1934		Christian Social	First Republic (1918–1934)
3		Heinrich Gleißner	1 March 1934	12 March 1938		Fatherland's Front	Austrofascism (1934–1938)
	(Reichsstatthalter and Gauleiter of the Reichsgau of Upper Danube)						Nazi Germany (1938–1945)
4		August Eigruber	14 March 1938	5 May 1945		NSDAP	Nazi Germany (1938–1945)
5		Adolf Eigl	16 May 1945	25 October 1945		Independent	Second Republic (1945–present)
6		Heinrich Gleißner	26 October 1945	2 May 1971		ÖVP	Second Republic (1945–present)
7		Erwin Wenzl	3 May 1971	19 October 1977		ÖVP	Second Republic (1945–present)
8		Josef Ratzenböck	19 October 1977	2 March 1995		ÖVP	Second Republic (1945–present)
9		Josef Pühringer	2 March 1995	5 April 2017		ÖVP	Second Republic (1945–present)
10		Thomas Stelzer	6 April 2017	Incumbent		ÖVP	Second Republic (1945–present)

== See also ==
- Upper Austria
