= Josef Pühringer =

Austrian politician

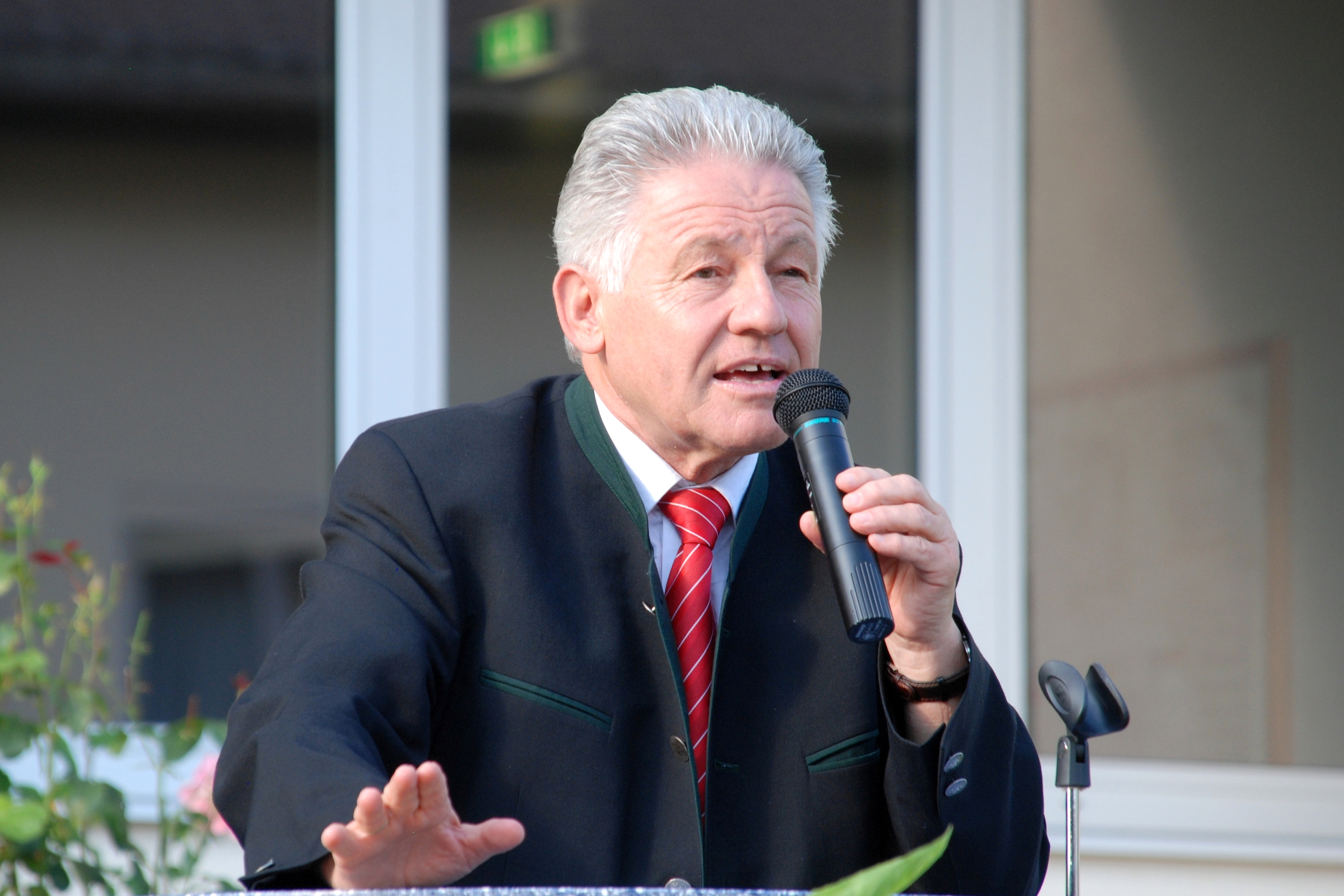
- Governor Pühringer in 2009

Governor of Upper Austria
- In office 2 March 1995 – 6 April 2017
- Preceded by: Josef Ratzenböck
- Succeeded by: Thomas Stelzer

Personal details
- Born: 30 October 1949 (age 76) Traun, Austria
- Party: Austrian People's Party

Josef Pühringer (German: [ˈpyːrɪŋɐ]; born 30 October 1949) is a former Austrian politician.

From 2 March 1995 to 6 April 2017 he was the governor (Landeshauptmann) of Upper Austria. He is a member of the Austrian People's Party (ÖVP).

He is a member of several Roman Catholic student fraternities that belong to the ÖCV and the MKV.

Pühringer is imperial Knight of Honor of the Order of St. George.
