= 2027 Tyrolean state election =

State election in Austria

- 2027

All 36 seats in the Landtag of Tyrol 19 seats needed for a majority
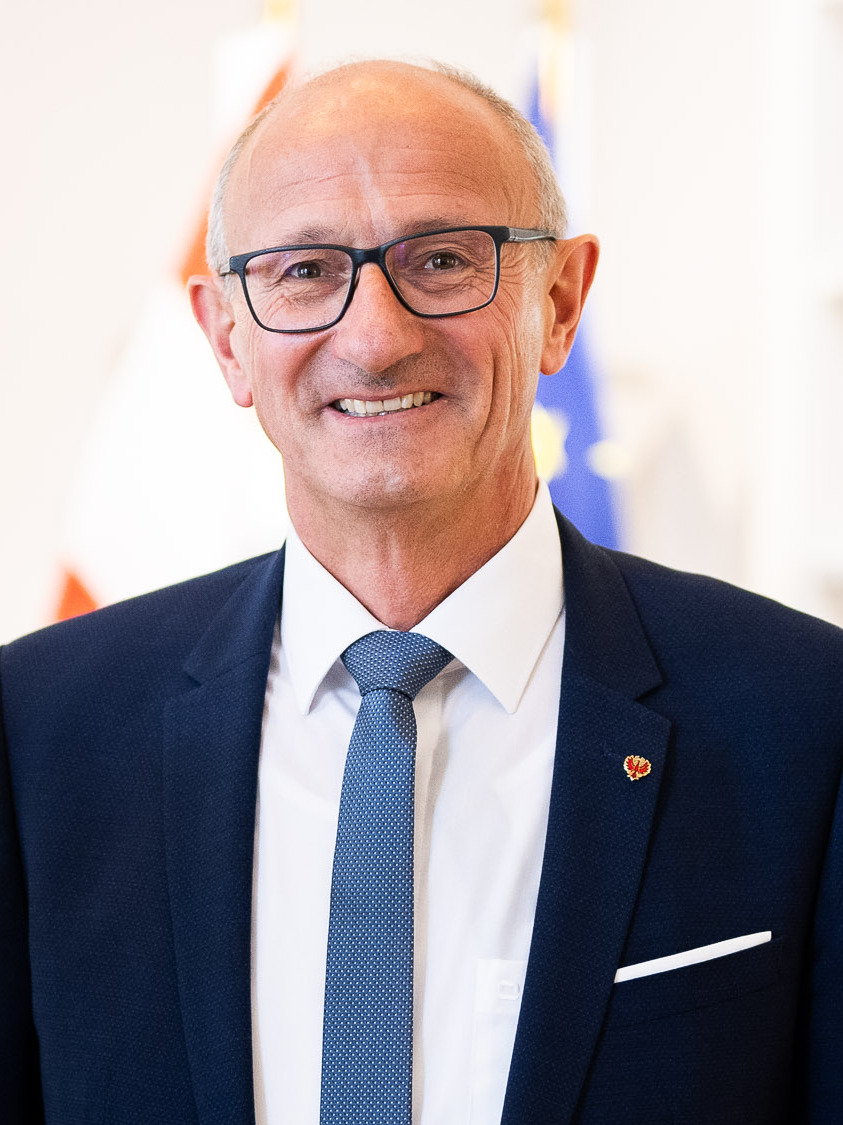

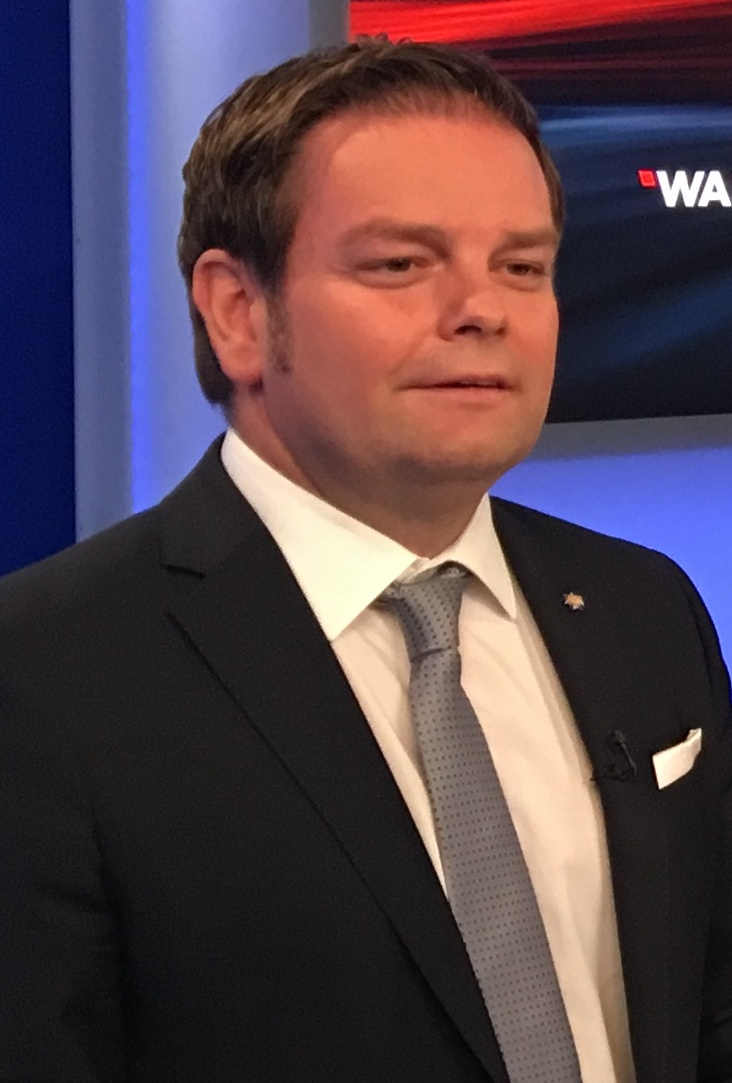

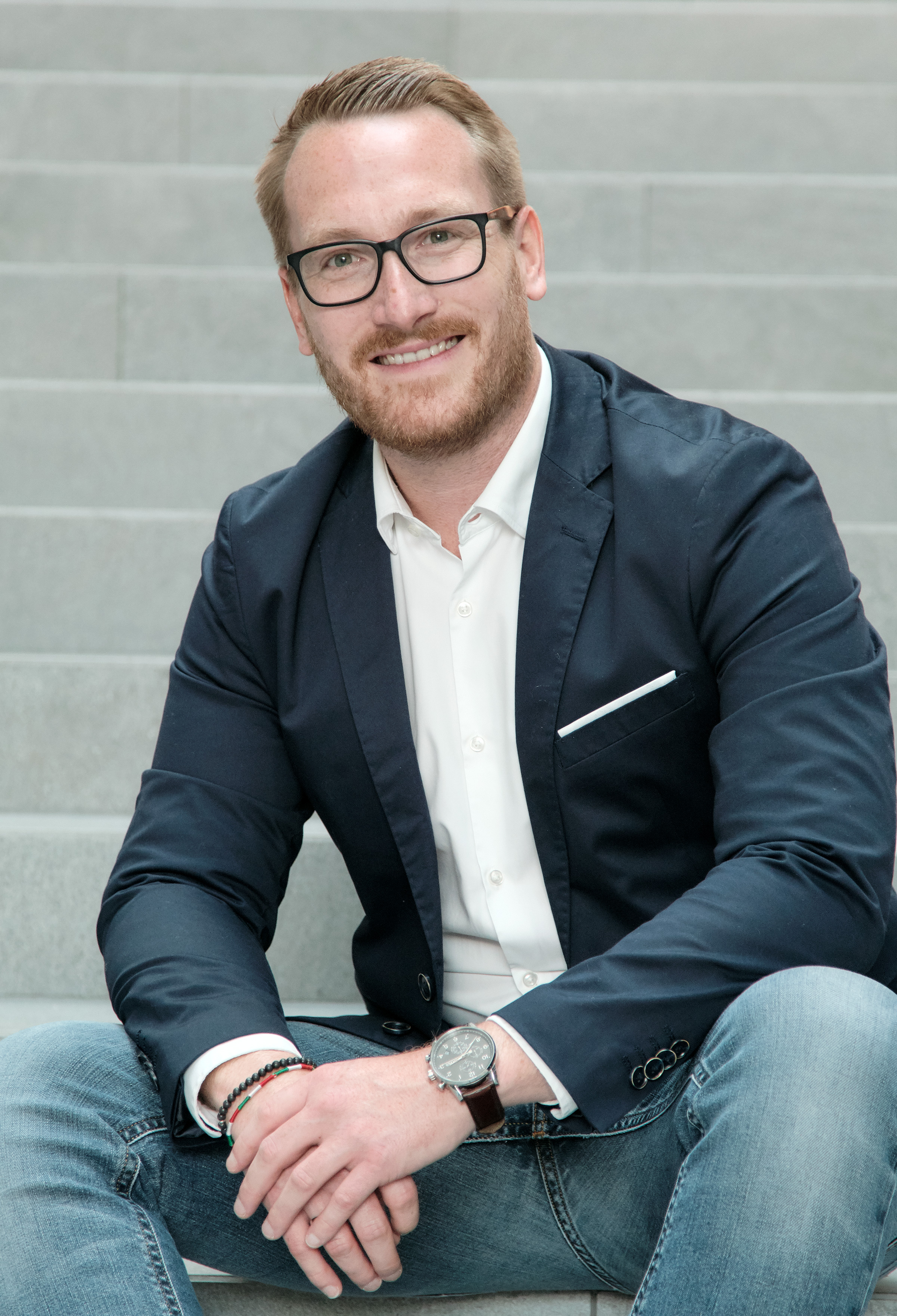

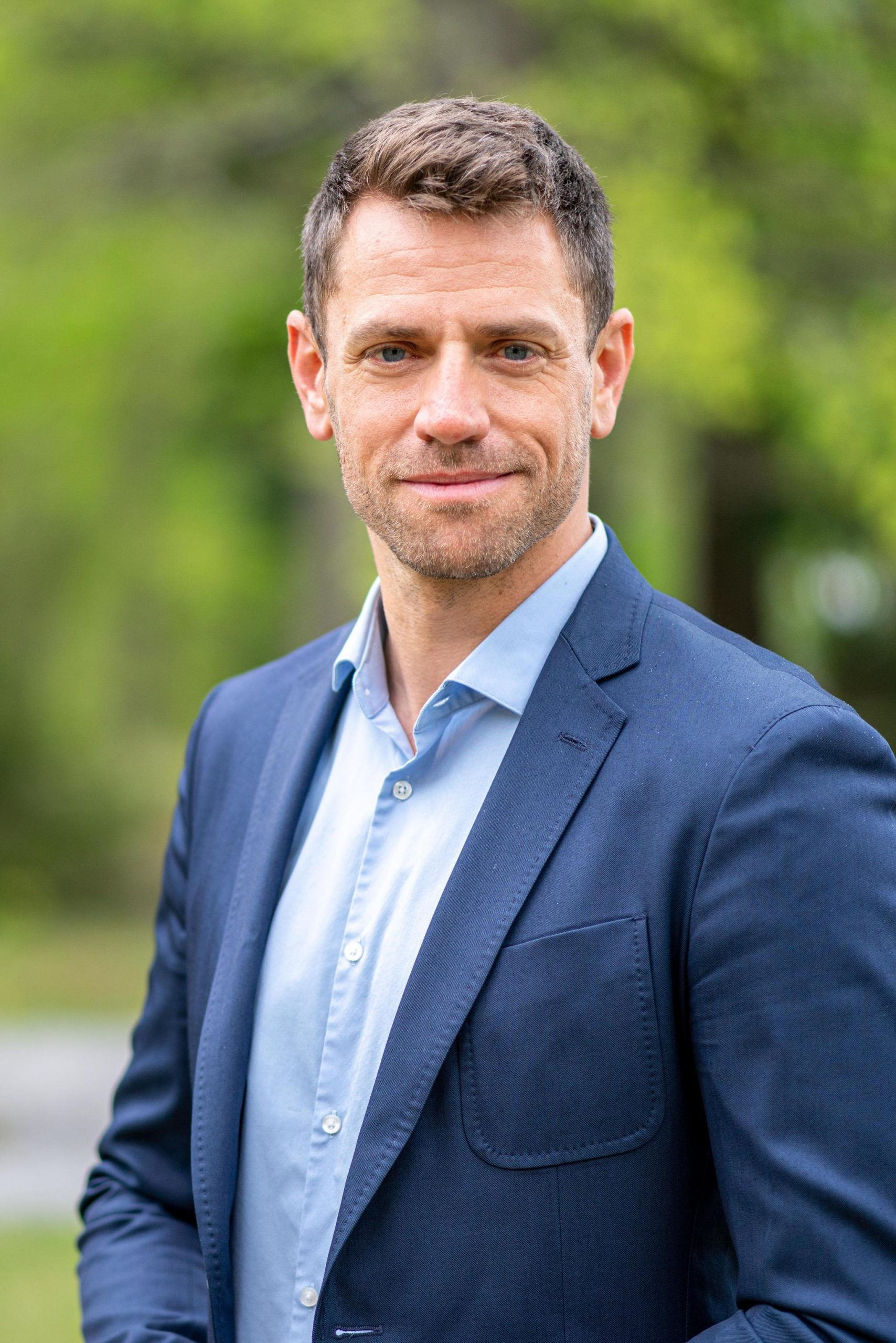
| Leader | Anton Mattle | Markus Abwerzger | Philip Wohlgemuth |
| Party | ÖVP | FPÖ | SPÖ |
| Last election | 14 seats, 34.7% | 7 seats, 18.8% | 7 seats, 17.5% |
| Leader | Andrea Haselwanter-Schneider | Gebi Mair | Birgit Obermüller |
| Party | FRITZ | Greens | NEOS |
| Last election | 3 seats, 9.9% | 3 seats, 9.2% | 2 seats, 6.3% |
Incumbent Governor
Anton Mattle
ÖVP

The 2027 Tyrolean state election is scheduled to be held in 2027 to elect the members of the Landtag of Tyrol. The election will determine the composition of the 36-seat legislature and the formation of the next state government.

The election follows the 2022 state election, in which the Austrian People's Party (ÖVP) remained the largest party despite recording its worst result in the state's history. Following the election, the ÖVP formed a coalition government with the Social Democratic Party of Austria (SPÖ), led by ÖVP Governor Anton Mattle.

== Background ==
The previous election was held on 25 September 2022. The ÖVP won 34.7% of the vote and remained the largest party, while the FPÖ overtook the SPÖ as the second-largest party in terms of vote share. The incumbent ÖVP–Green coalition lost its parliamentary majority, leading to the formation of an ÖVP–SPÖ coalition government under Governor Anton Mattle.

== Electoral system ==
The 36 seats of the Landtag of Tyrol are elected via open-list proportional representation in a two-step process. The seats are distributed among nine multi-member constituencies corresponding to the districts of Tyrol. To gain representation in the Landtag, parties must either win at least one seat directly in a constituency or surpass the 5% statewide electoral threshold.

Seats are allocated within constituencies using the Hare quota, while any remaining seats are distributed at the state level using the D'Hondt method to ensure overall proportionality between a party's share of the vote and its share of seats.

== Contesting parties ==
The table below lists parties represented in the previous Landtag.

| Name | | Ideology | Leader | 2022 result | |
| Name | | Ideology | Leader | Votes (%) | Seats |
|---|---|---|---|---|---|
| ÖVP | Austrian People's Party Anton Mattle Tyroler Volkspartei | Conservatism | Anton Mattle | 34.7% | 14 / 36 |
| FPÖ | Freedom Party of Austria Freiheitliche Partei Österreichs | Right-wing populism Euroscepticism | Markus Abwerzger | 18.8% | 7 / 36 |
| SPÖ | Social Democratic Party of Austria Sozialdemokratische Partei Österreichs | Social democracy | Georg Dornauer | 17.5% | 7 / 36 |
| FRITZ | Citizens' Forum Tyrol Bürgerforum Tirol | Centrist populism Regionalism | Andrea Haselwanter-Schneider | 9.9% | 3 / 36 |
| GRÜNE | The Greens – The Green Alternative Die Grünen – Die Grüne Alternative | Green politics | Gebi Mair & Petra Wohlfahrtstätter | 9.2% | 3 / 36 |
| NEOS | NEOS – The New Austria and Liberal Forum NEOS – Das Neue Österreich und Liberales Forum | Liberalism Pro-Europeanism | Dominik Oberhofer | 6.3% | 2 / 36 |

== Opinion polling ==
| Polling firm | Fieldwork date | Sample size | ÖVP | FPÖ | SPÖ | FRITZ | Grüne | NEOS | Others | Lead |
|---|---|---|---|---|---|---|---|---|---|---|
| Foresight | 11 Jun–6 Jul 2026 | 581 | 29 | 29 | 12 | 9 | 11 | 5 | 5 | Tie |
| IFDD | 23 Feb–2 Mar 2026 | 800 | 32 | 28 | 9 | 9 | 9 | 5 | 8 | 4 |
| Foresight | 18–27 Jun 2025 | 609 | 32 | 29 | 11 | 7 | 11 | 8 | 2 | 3 |
| Market | 28 Nov–15 Dec 2024 | 800 | 33 | 21 | 17 | 12 | 9 | 6 | 2 | 11 |
| 2022 state election | 25 September 2022 | – | 34.7 | 18.8 | 17.5 | 9.9 | 9.2 | 6.3 | 3.6 | 15.9 |
