= 2018 Tyrolean state election =

← 2013	25 February 2018	2022 →

All 36 seats in the Landtag of Tyrol 19 seats needed for a majority
- Turnout: 322,379 (60.0%) ▼0.4%
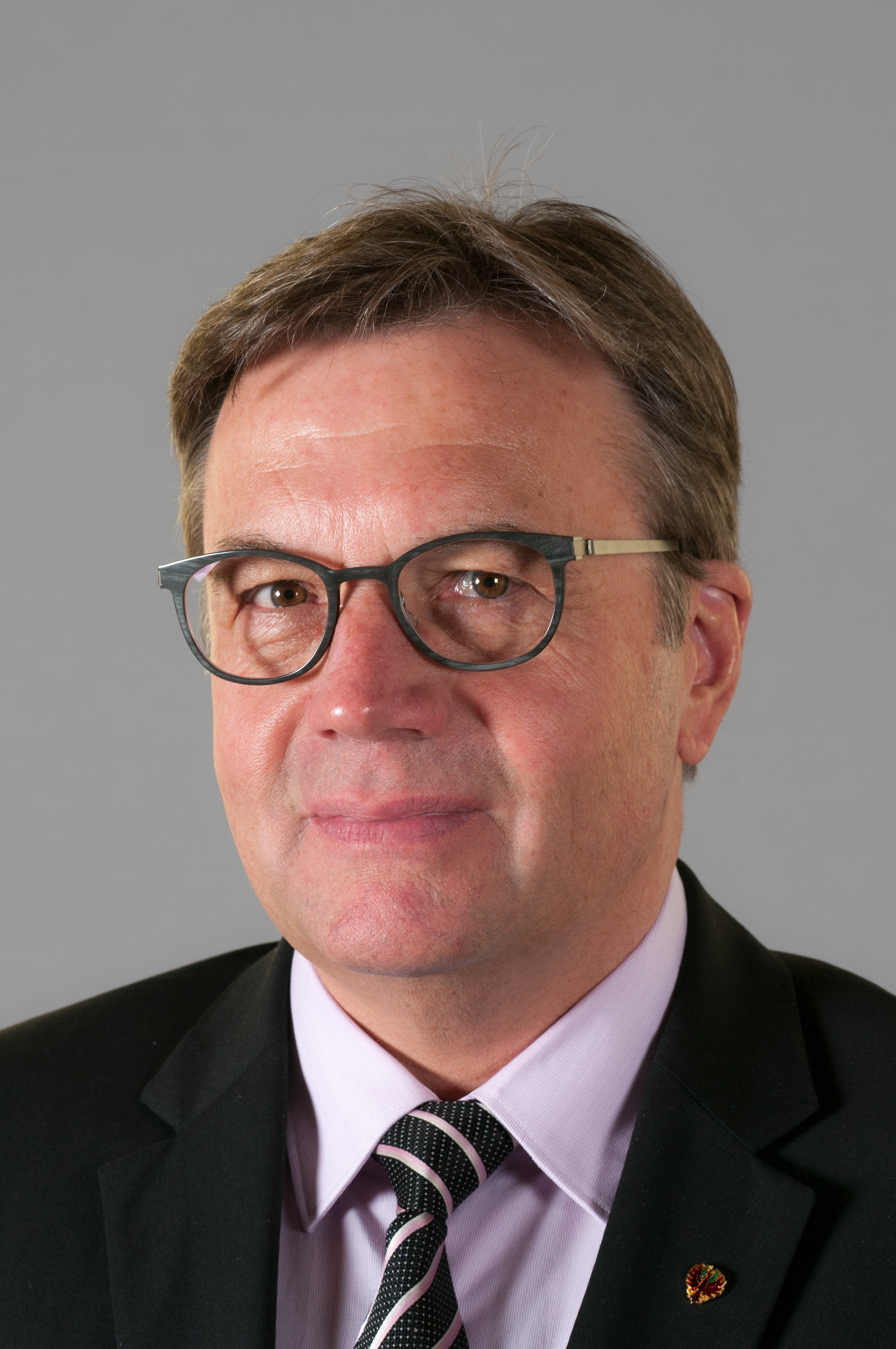

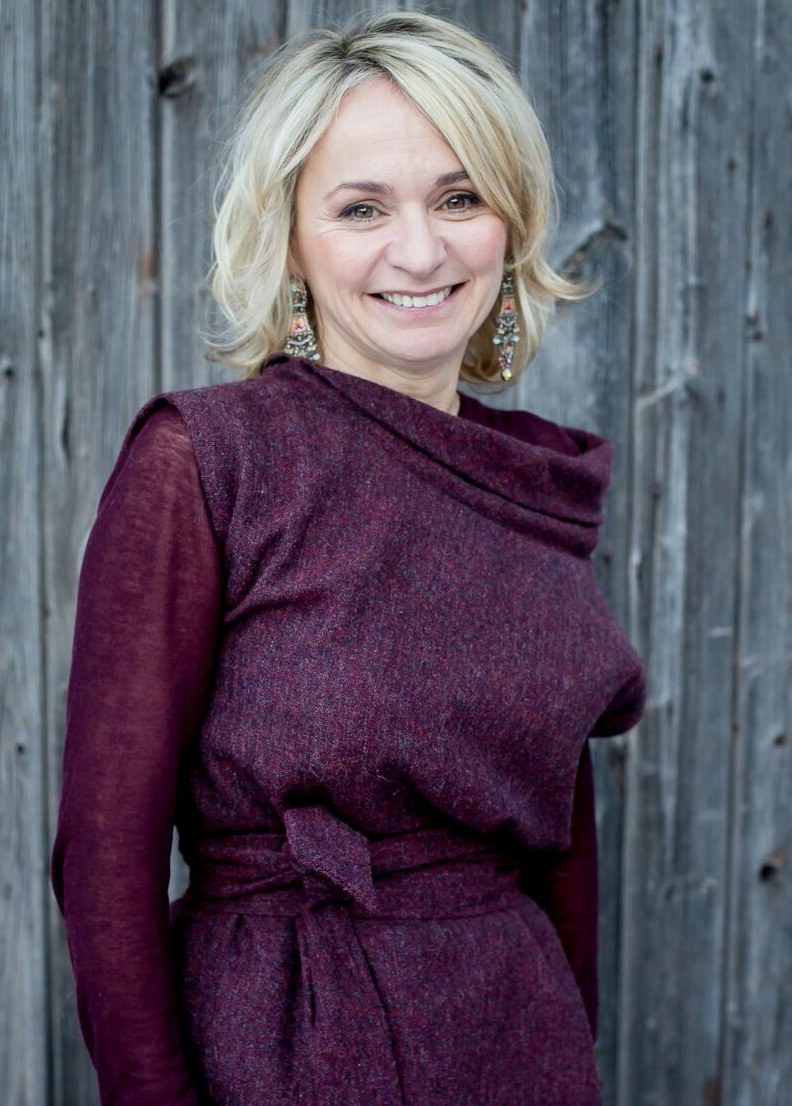

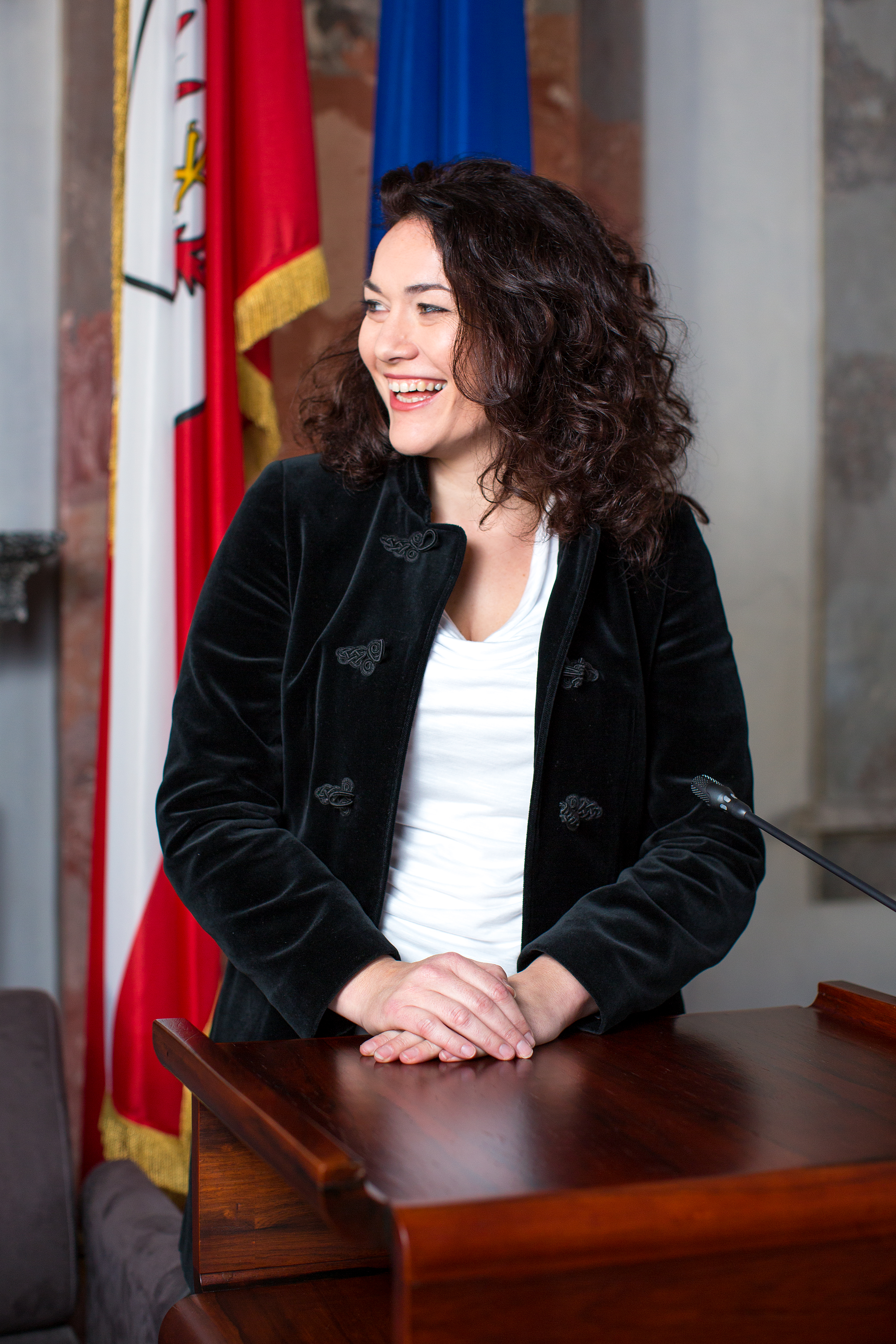

	First party	Second party	Third party
Leader	Günther Platter	Elisabeth Blanik	Markus Abwerzger
Party	ÖVP	SPÖ	FPÖ
Last election	16 seats, 39.4%	5 seats, 13.7%	4 seats, 9.3%
Seats won	17	6	5
Seat change	▲1	▲1	▲1
Popular vote	141,691	55,223	49,727
Percentage	44.3%	17.2%	15.5%
Swing	▲4.9%	▲3.5%	▲6.2%
	Fourth party	Fifth party	Sixth party
Leader	Ingrid Felipe	Andrea Haselwanter-Schneider	Dominik Oberhofer
Party	Greens	FRITZ	NEOS
Last election	5 seats, 12.6%	2 seats, 5.6%	Did not contest
Seats won	4	2	2
Seat change	▼1	0	▲2
Popular vote	34,168	17,471	16,670
Percentage	10.7%	5.5%	5.2%
Swing	▼1.9%	▼0.1%	▲5.2%
- Results by municipality. The lighter shade indicates a plurality; the darker shade indicates a majority.
Governor before election
Günther Platter
ÖVP
Elected Governor
Günther Platter
ÖVP

The 2018 Tyrolean state election was held on 25 February 2018 to elect the members of the Landtag of Tyrol.

The conservative Austrian People's Party (ÖVP) placed first with 44.3% of votes, a 4.9 percentage point swing. The centre-left Social Democratic Party of Austria (SPÖ) recovered somewhat from its worst ever result in 2013, rising 3.5 points to 17.2%. The Freedom Party of Austria (FPÖ) also made gains. The Greens took small losses, while Citizens' Forum Tyrol (FRITZ) stayed level. NEOS – The New Austria (NEOS) contested its first state election in Tyrol, debuting at 5.2%. Forward Tyrol, which won 9.5% in 2013, did not contest the election.

== Background ==
In the 2013 election, the ÖVP suffered its worst ever result in a Tyrolean state election, winning just 39.4%; prior to 2008, the party had always held a majority in the Landtag. The party subsequently formed a coalition with the Greens, who had achieved their best ever result in Tyrol at 12.6%.

== Electoral system ==
The 36 seats of the Landtag of Tyrol are elected via open list proportional representation in a two-step process. The seats are distributed between nine multi-member constituencies, corresponding to the districts of Tyrol. For parties to receive any representation in the Landtag, they must either win at least one seat in a constituency directly, or clear a 5 percent state-wide electoral threshold. Seats are distributed in constituencies according to the Hare quota, with any remaining seats allocated using the D'Hondt method at the state level, to ensure overall proportionality between a party's vote share and its share of seats.

== Contesting parties ==
The table below lists parties represented in the previous Landtag.

Name		Ideology	Leader	2013 result	
Name		Ideology	Leader	Votes (%)	Seats
ÖVP	Austrian People's Party; Österreichische Volkspartei	Christian democracy	Günther Platter	39.4%	16 / 36
SPÖ	Social Democratic Party of Austria; Sozialdemokratische Partei Österreichs	Social democracy	Elisabeth Blanik	13.7%	5 / 36
GRÜNE	The Greens – The Green Alternative; Die Grünen – Die Grüne Alternative	Green politics	Ingrid Felipe	12.6%	5 / 36
FPÖ	Freedom Party of Austria; Freiheitliche Partei Österreichs	Right-wing populism Euroscepticism	Markus Abwerzger	9.3%	4 / 36
FRITZ	Citizens' Forum Tyrol; Bürgerforum Tirol	Populism	Andrea Haselwanter-Schneider	5.6%	2 / 36

Forward Tyrol, which contested the previous election and won 9.5% of votes and four seats, did not contest the 2018 election.

In addition to the parties already represented in the Landtag, three parties collected enough signatures to be placed on the ballot.

- NEOS – The New Austria (NEOS)
- Family – The Tyrolean Family Party (FAMILY)
- Impulse Tyrol (IMPULS) – on the ballot in all constituencies except Schwaz

== Opinion polling ==
Polling firm	Fieldwork date	Sample size	ÖVP	SPÖ	Grüne	Forw.	FPÖ	FRITZ	NEOS	Impuls	Others	Lead
2018 state election	25 February 2018	–	44.3	17.2	10.7	–	15.5	5.5	5.2	0.5	1.1	27.1
IFAP	6–10 Feb 2018	600	40	16	12	–	17	6	7	–	2	23
Research Affairs	December 2017	600	38	14	12	–	24	3	5	–	4	14
GMK	December 2017	?	45	12	10	–	20	4	6	2	1	25
BrandSupport	June 2017	800	41.5	14	15	–	16.5	4	4	–	5	25.0
Market	May 2017	401	41	13	13	–	22	6	4	–	1	19
Research Affairs	December 2016	602	33	13	17	–	25	3	5	3	1	8
IFAP	December 2016	?	41	14	14	–	21	4	4	–	2	20
GMK	December 2016	?	41	12	14	–	25	3	3	–	1	16
Research Affairs	28 Nov–9 Dec 2015	608	35	12	16	–	19	5	6	–	7	16
GMK	7 Nov–11 Dec 2015	400	38	9	13	–	29	4	4	2	1	9
GfK	April 2015	500	39	13	16	1.5	13	5	4	1.5	7	26
GMK	December 2014	?	42	17	12	3	15	3	3	–	5	25
Gallup	December 2014	?	38	15	15	3	13	4	7	–	–	23
GMK	December 2013	?	41	11	16	2	15	2	8	–	3	25
Karmasin	22 Nov–11 Dec 2013	500	41	13	14	6	12	4	–	–	10	27
2013 state election	28 April 2013	–	39.4	13.7	12.6	9.5	9.3	5.6	–	–	9.8	25.7

== Results ==
Party	Votes	%	+/−	Seats	+/−
Austrian People's Party (ÖVP)	141,691	44.26	+4.91	17	+1
Social Democratic Party of Austria (SPÖ)	55,224	17.25	+3.53	6	+1
Freedom Party of Austria (FPÖ)	49,727	15.53	+6.19	5	+1
The Greens – The Green Alternative (GRÜNE)	34,167	10.67	–1.92	4	–1
Citizens' Forum Tyrol (FRITZ)	17,471	5.46	–0.15	2	±0
NEOS – The New Austria (NEOS)	16,670	5.21	+5.21	2	+2
Family – The Tyrolean Family Party (FAMILY)	3,645	1.14	New	0	New
Impulse Tyrol (IMPULS)	1,539	0.48	New	0	New
Invalid/blank votes	2,245	–	–	–	–
Total	322,379	100	–	36	0
Registered voters/turnout	537,273	60.00	–0.40	–	–
Source: Tyrolean Government

Popular vote
ÖVP	44.26%
SPÖ	17.25%
FPÖ	15.53%
GRÜNE	10.67%
FRITZ	5.46%
NEOS	5.21%
Other	1.62%

Landtag seats
ÖVP	47.22%
SPÖ	16.67%
FPÖ	13.89%
GRÜNE	11.11%
FRITZ	5.56%
NEOS	5.56%

=== Results by constituency ===
Constituency	ÖVP		SPÖ		FPÖ		Grüne		FRITZ		NEOS		Others	Total seats	Turnout
Constituency	%	S	%	S	%	S	%	S	%	S	%	S	%	Total seats	Turnout
Innsbruck City	25.9	1	22.8	1	16.2	1	19.0	1	7.9		7.3		1.0	4	58.4
Imst	53.1	1	12.4		14.8		7.8		5.1		5.3		1.5	1	60.2
Innsbruck-Land	39.8	3	18.8	1	16.4	1	11.8	1	6.6		5.5		1.2	6	63.8
Kitzbühel	52.8	1	14.6		14.2		8.8		4.0		4.5		1.1	1	57.7
Kufstein	44.7	2	15.3		17.5		10.2		5.3		4.2		2.7	2	58.1
Landeck	63.8	1	13.1		9.4		5.4		2.6		4.8		0.8	1	61.9
Lienz	49.2	1	21.9		13.3		5.5		2.8		3.7		3.4	1	58.9
Reutte	49.9		13.3		14.8		8.4		3.3		6.6		3.7	0	58.6
Schwaz	50.8	2	14.5		16.9		7.8		5.0		4.1		1.0	2	58.3
Remaining seats		5		4		3		2		2		2		18	
Total	44.3	17	17.2	6	15.5	5	10.7	4	5.5	2	5.2	2	1.6	36	60.0
Source: Tyrolean Government

== Aftermath ==
The ÖVP held exploratory discussions with all other parties, narrowing their options to the SPÖ and Greens after the first round of talks. On 8 March, Governor Platter announced formal negotiations with the Greens would take place. On 20 March, they announced they had come to a coalition agreement. The government subsequently took office for a second term.
