= 2003 Tyrolean state election =

← 1999	28 September 2003	2008 →

All 36 seats in the Landtag of Tyrol 19 seats needed for a majority
- Turnout: 294,527 (60.9%) ▼19.7%
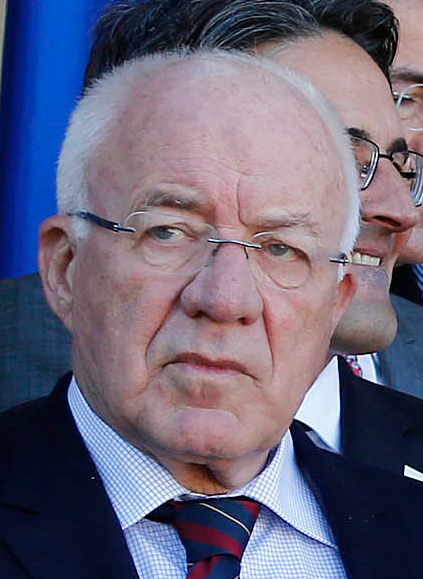
	First party	Second party
		SPÖ
Leader	Herwig van Staa	Hannes Gschwentner
Party	ÖVP	SPÖ
Last election	18 seats, 47.2%	8 seats, 21.8%
Seats won	20	9
Seat change	▲2	▲1
Popular vote	144,774	75,019
Percentage	49.9%	25.8%
Swing	▲2.7%	▲4.1%
	Third party	Fourth party
Party	Greens	FPÖ
Last election	3 seats, 8.0%	7 seats, 19.6%
Seats won	5	2
Seat change	▲2	▼5
Popular vote	45,239	23,113
Percentage	15.6%	8.0%
Swing	▲7.6%	▼11.6%
Governor before election
Herwig van Staa
ÖVP
Elected Governor
Herwig van Staa
ÖVP

The 2003 Tyrolean state election was held on 28 September 2003 to elect the members of the Landtag of Tyrol.

The Austrian People's Party (ÖVP) regained the absolute majority it had lost in 1999, winning just under 50% of votes cast. The Social Democratic Party of Austria (SPÖ) made gains, and The Greens achieved one of their best election results nationwide up to this point, winning 15.6% and five seats. This was enabled by a collapse in support for the Freedom Party of Austria (FPÖ), which lost more than half its vote share and five of its seven seats.

The election was marked by a major decline in participation due to the repeal of compulsory voting; turnout fell from 81% to 61%. As a result, only the Greens actually gained votes compared to 1999, recording an increase of 17,000. By contrast, the ÖVP lost 19,000 votes, the SPÖ 500, and the FPÖ 45,000.

Despite regaining its majority, the ÖVP under Governor Herwig van Staa chose to renew the incumbent coalition with the SPÖ.

== Background ==
In the 1999 election, the ÖVP narrowly lost its absolute majority for the first time in history; the SPÖ and FPÖ each made gains, while the Greens suffered losses. The ÖVP formed a coalition with the SPÖ.

In 2002, Governor Wendelin Weingartner his pending retirement. He was replaced by Innsbruck mayor Herwig van Staa in October.

== Electoral system ==
The 36 seats of the Landtag of Tyrol are elected via open list proportional representation in a two-step process. The seats are distributed between nine multi-member constituencies, corresponding to the districts of Tyrol. For parties to receive any representation in the Landtag, they must either win at least one seat in a constituency directly, or clear a 5 percent state-wide electoral threshold. Seats are distributed in constituencies according to the Hare quota, with any remaining seats allocated using the D'Hondt method at the state level, to ensure overall proportionality between a party's vote share and its share of seats.

== Contesting parties ==
The table below lists parties represented in the previous Landtag.

Name		Ideology	Leader	1999 result	
Name		Ideology	Leader	Votes (%)	Seats
ÖVP	Austrian People's Party; Österreichische Volkspartei	Christian democracy	Herwig van Staa	47.2%	18 / 36
SPÖ	Social Democratic Party of Austria; Sozialdemokratische Partei Österreichs	Social democracy	Hannes Gschwentner	21.8%	8 / 36
FPÖ	Freedom Party of Austria; Freiheitliche Partei Österreichs	Right-wing populism Euroscepticism	?	19.6%	7 / 36
GRÜNE	Green Alternative Tyrol; Grüne Alternative Tirol	Green politics	?	8.0%	3 / 36

In addition to the parties already represented in the Landtag, one party collected enough signatures to be placed on the ballot.

- Communist Party of Austria (KPÖ) – on the ballot only in Innsbruck City, Innsbruck-Land, and Kufstein

== Results ==
Party	Votes	%	+/−	Seats	+/−
Austrian People's Party (ÖVP)	144,774	49.89	+2.67	20	+2
Social Democratic Party of Austria (SPÖ)	75,019	25.85	+4.08	9	+1
The Greens – The Green Alternative (GRÜNE)	45,239	15.59	+7.56	5	+2
Freedom Party of Austria (FPÖ)	23,113	7.97	–11.64	2	–5
Communist Party of Austria (KPÖ)	2,032	0.70	+0.56	0	±0
Invalid/blank votes	4,350	–	–	–	–
Total	294,527	100	–	36	0
Registered voters/turnout	483,559	60.91	–19.66	–	–
Source: Tyrolean Government

Popular vote
ÖVP	49.89%
SPÖ	25.85%
GRÜNE	15.59%
FPÖ	7.97%
KPÖ	0.70%

Landtag seats
ÖVP	55.56%
SPÖ	25.00%
GRÜNE	13.89%
FPÖ	5.56%

=== Results by constituency ===
Constituency	ÖVP		SPÖ		Grüne		FPÖ		KPÖ	Total seats	Turnout
Constituency	%	S	%	S	%	S	%	S	%	Total seats	Turnout
Innsbruck City	35.0	2	28.4	1	27.0	1	7.8		1.8	4	54.6
Imst	61.9	2	22.2		9.5		6.3			2	63.9
Innsbruck-Land	46.6	3	26.2	2	18.0	1	8.1		1.2	6	62.4
Kitzbühel	53.4	1	26.2		11.2		9.2			1	61.5
Kufstein	47.5	2	27.8	1	13.5		10.1		1.1	3	61.9
Landeck	56.5	1	29.9		8.9		4.7			1	64.7
Lienz	62.6	2	17.0		12.2		8.2			2	63.1
Reutte	56.9	1	23.8		12.8		6.4			1	61.6
Schwaz	53.0	2	26.4	1	12.7		7.9			3	59.8
Remaining seats		4		4		3		2		13	
Total	49.9	20	25.9	9	15.6	5	8.0	2	0.7	36	60.9
Source: Tyrolean Government
