= Landtag of Tyrol =

State parliament of Tyrol, Austria

Tyrolean Landtag Tiroler Landtag
- 22nd Tyrolean Landtag
- Established: 1919

Leadership
- Governor: Anton Mattle, Austrian People's Party

Structure
- Seats: 36
- Political groups: Government (21): ÖVP (14); SPÖ (7); Opposition (15): FPÖ (7); FRITZ (3); GRÜNE (3); NEOS (2)
- Length of term: 5 years

Elections
- Last election: 25 September 2022

Meeting place
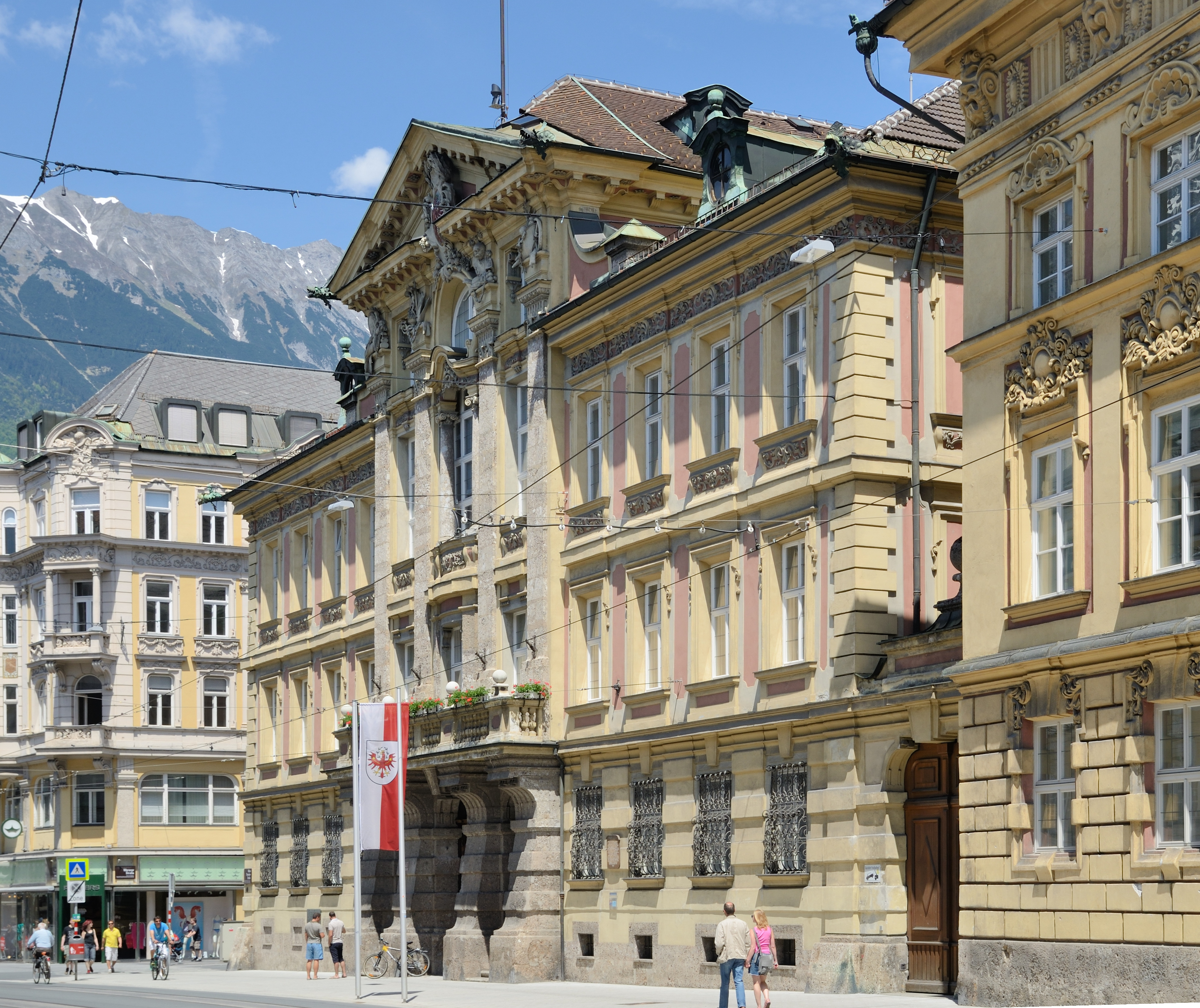

The Tyrolean Landtag (German: Tiroler Landtag) is the assembly of the state of Tyrol, Austria.
