= Citizens' Club Tyrol =

The Citizens' Club Tyrol (German: BürgerKlub-Tirol) is an Austrian political party active in Tyrol. It was founded by Fritz Gurgiser, formerly co-leader of the Citizens' Forum Tyrol, in 2009. In the 2013 state election the party won 4.8% of the vote and failed to elect any members of the local Landtag.

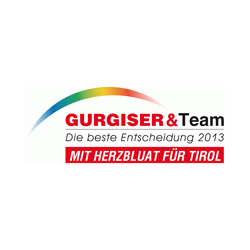
Logo
