= 2027 elections in the European Union =

- 2027

The 2027 elections in the European Union include national and regional elections in the EU member states.

== National elections ==
=== Parliamentary elections ===
Member state	Election	Parliament before	Head of Government before	Party	EU Party	Parliament after	Head of government after	Party	EU party
Estonia	By 7 March		Kristen Michal	Reform	ALDE				
Finland	18 April		Petteri Orpo	National Coalition	EPP				
Greece	By 25 July		Kyriakos Mitsotakis	ND	EPP				
Slovakia	By 28 September		Robert Fico	Smer	Ind. (Note: Doesn't belong to any European party.)				
Poland	By 11 November		Donald Tusk	KO	EPP				
Italy	By 22 December		Giorgia Meloni	Brothers of Italy	ECR				

=== Presidential elections ===
Member state	Election	President before	Party	EU Party
France	18 April	Emmanuel Macron	RE	Ind. (Note: Renaissance is in the Renew Europe group of the European Parliament, but does not belong to any European party.)

=== Presidential elections in parliamentary states ===
Member state	Election	President before	Party	EU Party
Germany	30 January	Frank-Walter Steinmeier	SPD	PES
Latvia	By May	Edgars Rinkēvičs	Unity	EPP
Slovenia	By October	Nataša Pirc Musar	Ind.	Ind.

== Local elections ==
=== Austria ===
- 2027 Tyrolean state election
- 2027 Upper Austrian state election

=== Finland ===
- 2027 Ålandic legislative election, by October

=== Germany ===
- 2027 Saarland state election, 18 April
- 2027 Schleswig-Holstein state election, 18 April
- 2027 North Rhine-Westphalia state election, 25 April
- 2027 Bremen state election, 30 May
- 2027 Lower Saxony state election

=== Italy ===
- 2027 Italian local elections
- 2027 Sicilian regional election

=== Lithuania ===
- 2027 Lithuanian municipal elections, 7 March

=== Netherlands ===
- 2027 Dutch provincial elections, 17 March, also indirectly determining the composition of the Senate.

=== Spain ===
- 2027 Spanish regional elections, 23 May
  - 2027 Asturian regional election
  - 2027 Balearic regional election
  - 2027 Canarian regional election
  - 2027 Cantabrian regional election
  - 2027 Castilian-Manchegan regional election
  - 2027 Riojan regional election
  - 2027 Madrilenian regional election
  - 2027 Murcian regional election
  - 2027 Navarrese regional election
  - 2027 Valencian regional election
- 2027 Spanish local elections, 23 May
  - 2027 Barcelona municipal election
  - 2027 Madrid municipal election
  - 2027 Seville municipal election
  - 2027 Valencia municipal election
  - 2027 Zaragoza municipal election
