= 2022 Tyrolean state election =

State election in Austria

- 25 September 2022

All 36 seats in the Landtag of Tyrol 19 seats needed for a majority
- Turnout: 347,917 (65.0%) ▲5.0%
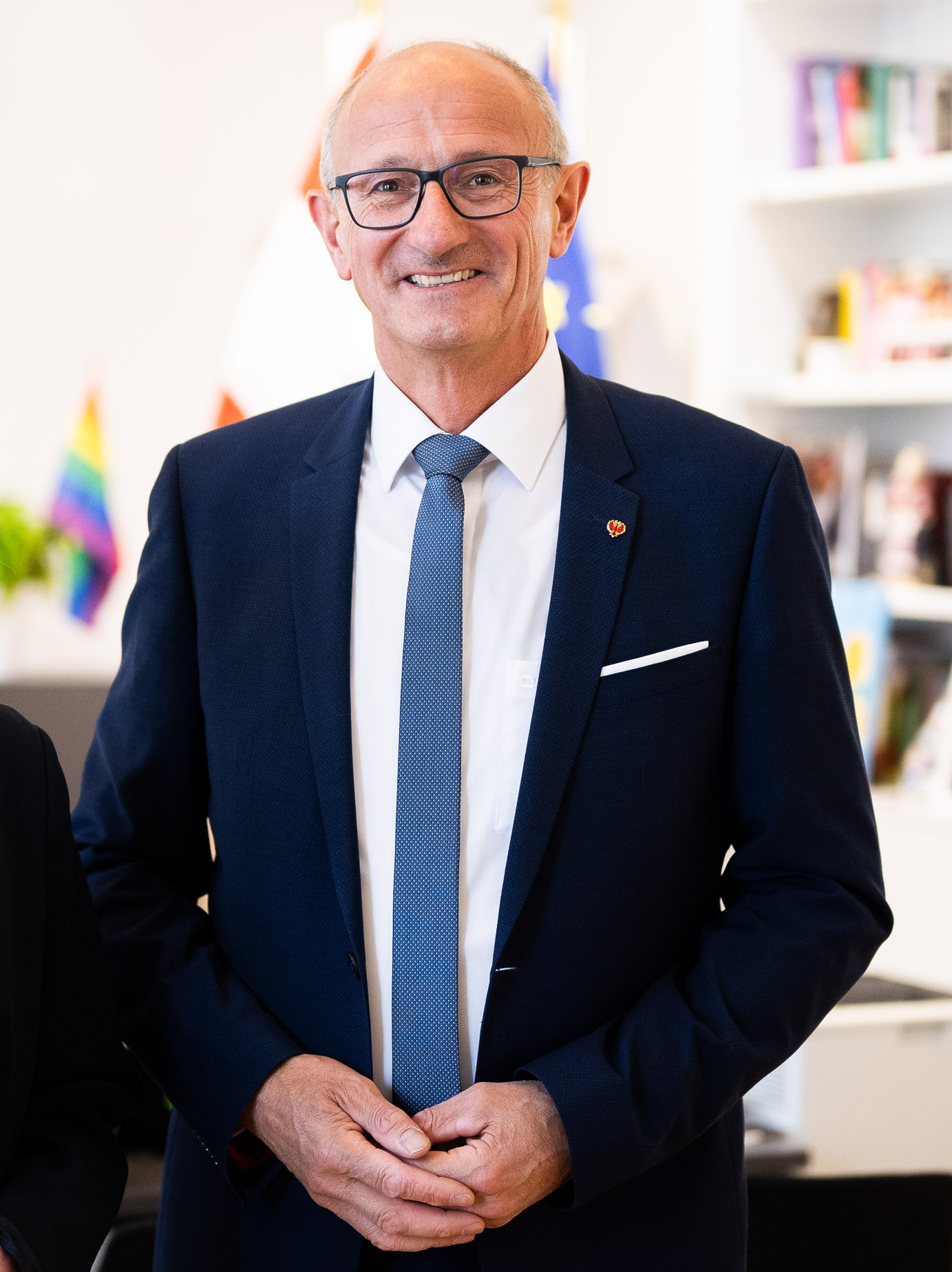

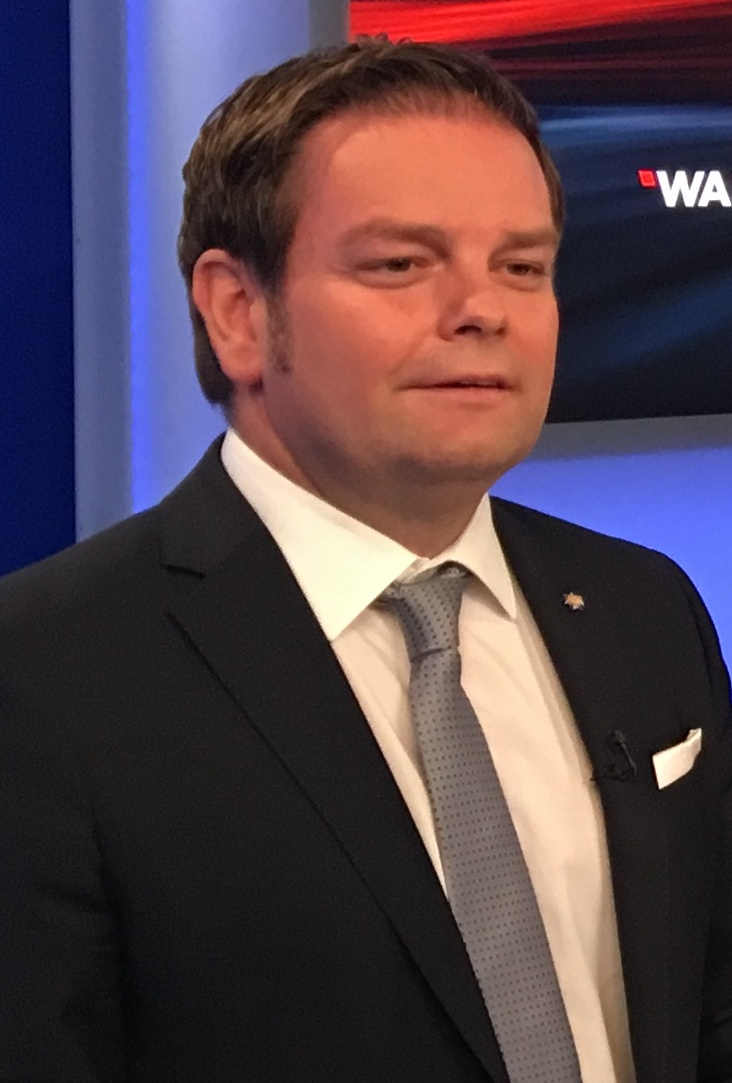

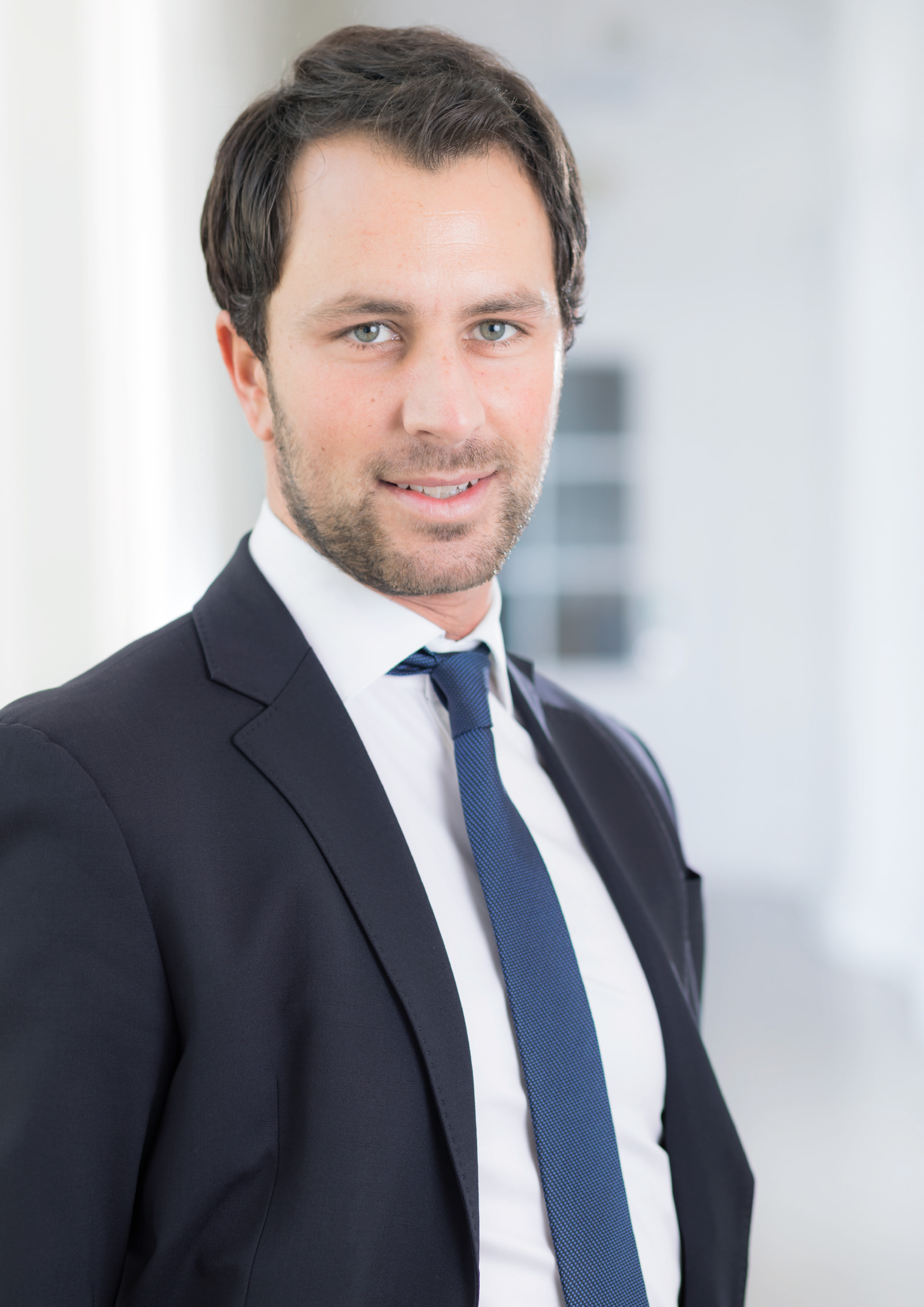

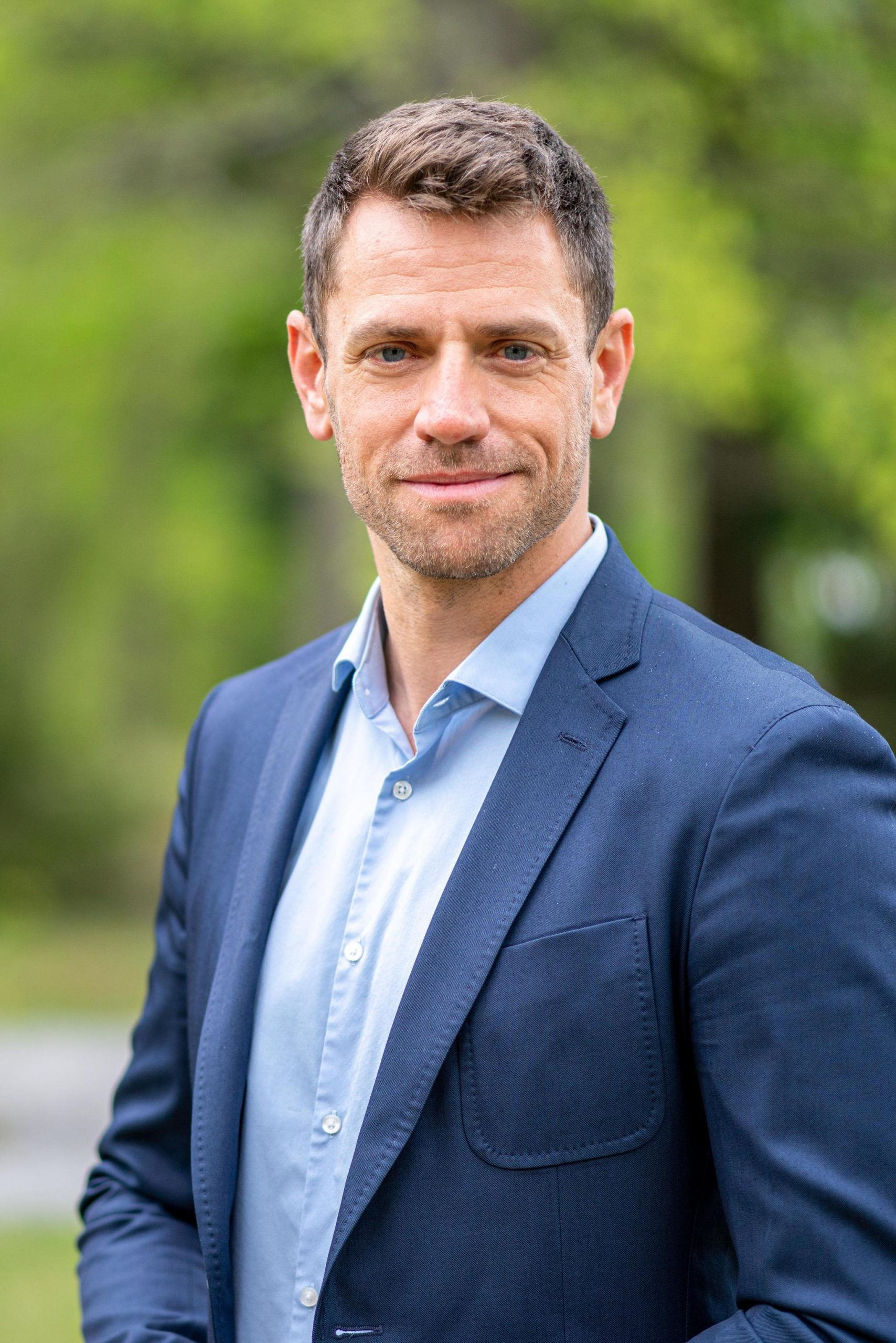

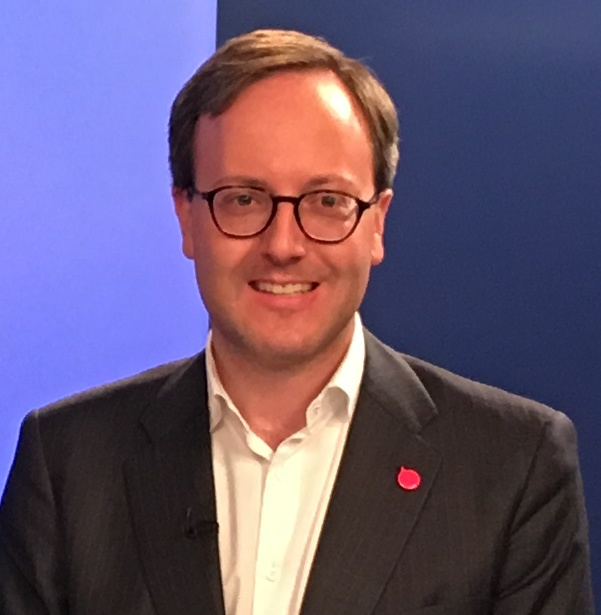
	First party	Second party	Third party
Leader	Anton Mattle	Markus Abwerzger	Georg Dornauer
Party	ÖVP	FPÖ	SPÖ
Last election	17 seats, 44.3%	5 seats, 15.5%	6 seats, 17.2%
Seats won	14	7	7
Seat change	▼3	▲2	▲1
Popular vote	119,167	64,683	60,009
Percentage	34.7%	18.8%	17.5%
Swing	▼9.6%	▲3.3%	▲0.3%
	Fourth party	Fifth party	Sixth party
Leader	Andrea Haselwanter-Schneider	Gebi Mair & Petra Wohlfahrtstätter	Dominik Oberhofer
Party	FRITZ	Greens	NEOS
Last election	2 seats, 5.5%	4 seats, 10.7%	2 seats, 5.2%
Seats won	3	3	2
Seat change	▲1	▼1	0
Popular vote	33,990	31,598	21,589
Percentage	9.9%	9.2%	6.3%
Swing	▲4.4%	▼1.5%	▲1.1%
- Results by municipality.
Governor before election
Günther Platter
ÖVP
Elected Governor
Anton Mattle
ÖVP

The 2022 Tyrolean state election was held on 25 September 2022 to elect the members of the Landtag of Tyrol. Incumbent Governor Günther Platter of the Austrian People's Party (ÖVP) retired at the election; Anton Mattle was the party's lead candidate.

The ÖVP suffered its worst-ever result in the state, winning less than 35% of votes, but remained well ahead of the other parties and performed substantially better than most opinion polling had predicted. The Greens also recorded a decline, while all opposition parties grew in support. The Freedom Party of Austria (FPÖ) overtook the Social Democratic Party of Austria (SPÖ) as the second-largest party for the first time, though they remained tied on seven seats each. Citizens' Forum Tyrol improved to 10%, though this was below expectations. NEOS retained its two seats with a small positive swing. Overall, the ÖVP lost three seats and the Greens one, leaving the incumbent coalition without a majority. ÖVP leader Anton Mattle ruled out a coalition with the FPÖ. All parties indicated they were open to government negotiations. Ultimately, ÖVP and SPÖ formed a coalition government.

== Background ==
In the 2018 election, the ÖVP remained the largest party with 44.3% of votes and formed a coalition with the Greens. After Governor Günther Platter announced his retirement from politics in June 2022, the government agreed to hold early elections in September.

== Electoral system ==
The 36 seats of the Landtag of Tyrol are elected via open list proportional representation in a two-step process. The seats are distributed between nine multi-member constituencies, corresponding to the districts of Tyrol. For parties to receive any representation in the Landtag, they must either win at least one seat in a constituency directly, or clear a 5 percent state-wide electoral threshold. Seats are distributed in constituencies according to the Hare quota, with any remaining seats allocated using the D'Hondt method at the state level, to ensure overall proportionality between a party's vote share and its share of seats.

== Contesting parties ==
The table below lists parties represented in the previous Landtag.

Name		Ideology	Leader	2013 result	
Name		Ideology	Leader	Votes (%)	Seats
ÖVP	Austrian People's Party; Anton Mattle Tyroler Volkspartei	Conservatism	Anton Mattle	44.3%	17 / 36
SPÖ	Social Democratic Party of Austria; Sozialdemokratische Partei Österreichs	Social democracy	Georg Dornauer	17.2%	6 / 36
FPÖ	Freedom Party of Austria; Freiheitliche Partei Österreichs	Right-wing populism Euroscepticism	Markus Abwerzger	15.5%	5 / 36
GRÜNE	The Greens – The Green Alternative; Die Grünen – Die Grüne Alternative	Green politics	Gebi Mair & Petra Wohlfahrtstätter	10.7%	4 / 36
FRITZ	Citizens' Forum Tyrol; Bürgerforum Tirol	Centrist Populism; Regionalism	Andrea Haselwanter-Schneider	5.5%	2 / 36
NEOS	NEOS – The New Austria and Liberal Forum; NEOS – Das Neue Österreich und Liberales Forum	Liberalism; Pro-Europeanism	Dominik Oberhofer	5.2%	2 / 36

In addition to the parties already represented in the Landtag, three parties collected enough signatures to be placed on the ballot.

- MFG Austria – People Freedom Fundamental Rights (MFG)
- Communist Party of Austria (KPÖ) – on the ballot only in Innsbruck and Innsbruck-Land
- Join In – The List for All Others (MACH MIT) – on the ballot only in Innsbruck-Land

== Campaign ==
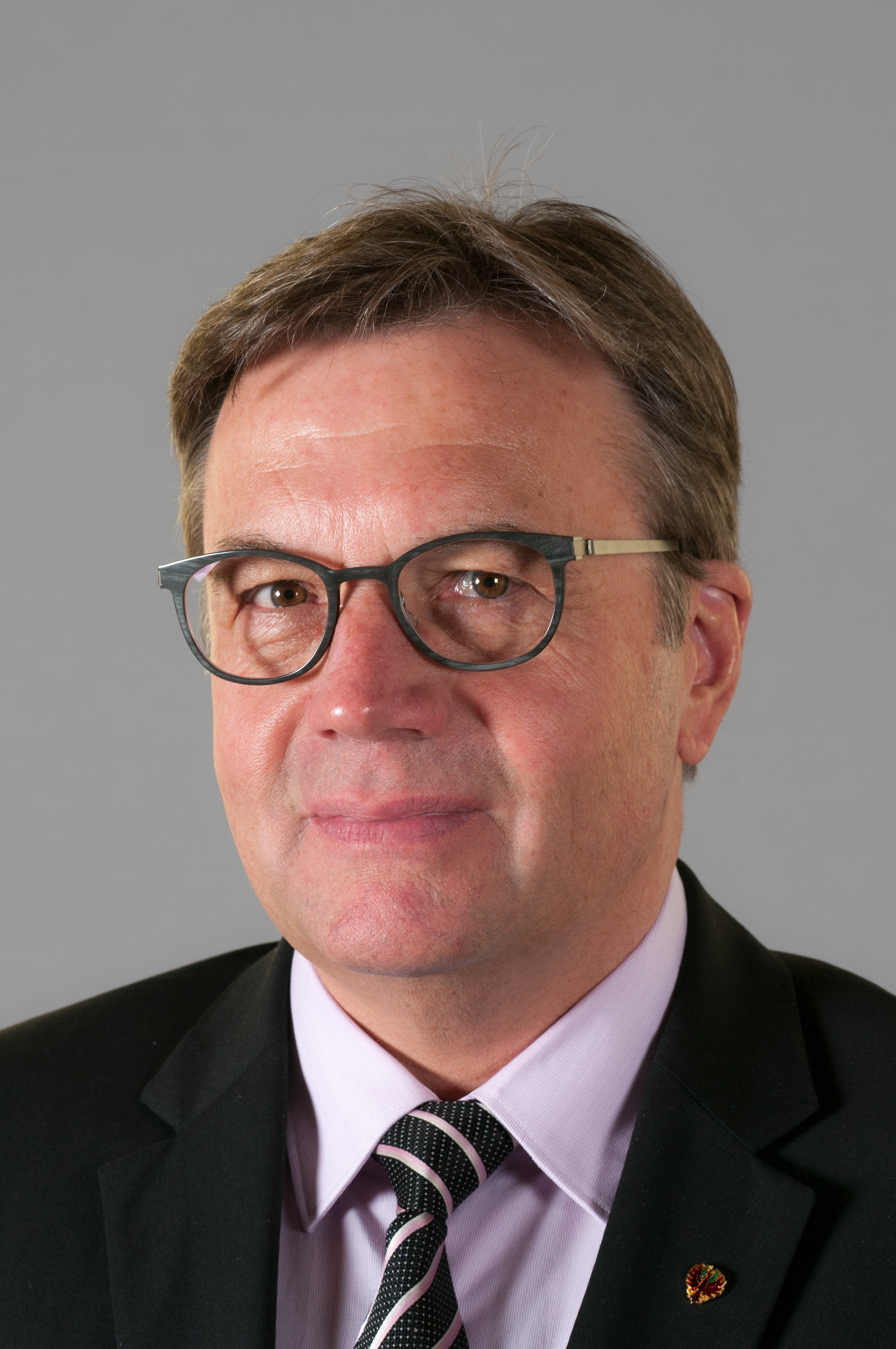
Günther Platter

The Tyrol state election was the first major (regional) election after the resignation of former Austrian Chancellor Sebastian Kurz and the following ÖVP-Green government reshuffle at the national level, therefore being a test case for all major state elections that will follow in 2023 (Lower Austria, Carinthia and Salzburg). The election campaign was primarily impacted by the retirement of longtime governor Günther Platter and the questionable management of the state during the onset of the Covid-19 pandemic in Ischgl and following events. More recently, the campaign was impacted by the rising prices in general and skyrocketing electricity prices in particular, as well as the general massive unpopularity of the Austrian federal ÖVP-Green government.

== Opinion polling ==
Polling firm	Fieldwork date	Sample size	ÖVP	SPÖ	FPÖ	Grüne	FRITZ	NEOS	MFG	Others	Lead
2022 state election	25 September 2022	–	34.7	17.5	18.8	9.2	9.9	6.3	2.8	0.8	15.9
Market-Lazarsfeld	September 2022	573	27	21	21	8	14	6	2	1	6
Market-Lazarsfeld	September 2022	645	26	20	19	8	15	6	2	4	6
Market	28 Jul–17 Aug 2022	600	26	21	18	9	14	7	3	2	5
GMK	26–31 Aug 2022	600	37	16	17	10	6	8	4	–	4
IMAD	29 Aug–1 Sep 2022	600	25.3	17.8	16.6	12.4	11.5	11.7	2.4	KPÖ 2.3	7.5
Gallup	8–20 Aug 2022	600	26	19	20	11	9	8	3	4 (Note: KPÖ 1, MACH MIT 1, Other 2)	6
Market-Lazarsfeld	August 2022	504	25	21	19	7	15	7	3	3	4
IFDD	21–27 Jul 2022	800	29	21	17	11	10	8	3	1	12
IMAD	22–25 Jul 2022	600	29.1	15.3	15.7	12.6	10.2	12.3	2.5	KPÖ 2.3	13.4
IMAD	20–23 Jun 2022	600	30.1	15.2	16.6	12.5	9.6	11.5	2.4	KPÖ 2.1	13.5
IMAD	27–29 Dec 2021	500	34.3	11.8	15.5	12.5	7.7	9.7	6.5	2.0	18.8
GMK	9–15 Dec 2021	400	39	9	18	12	6	8	6	2	21
Gallup	Nov–Dec 2021	600	32	17	15	12	6	9	7	2	15
Market	4–22 Oct 2021	1,000	37	17	16	13	6	10	–	1	20
Research Affairs	2–14 Dec 2020	600	43	15	13	13	4	8	–	4	28
GMK	11–16 Dec 2020	400	52	9	10	15	4	8	–	2	37
IMAD	14–17 Dec 2020	500	42.7	11.2	14.9	13.1	8.3	9.4	–	0.4	27.8
IMAD	14–27 Sep 2020	501	43.0	11.7	14.3	13.3	8.6	9.1	–	–	28.7
GMK	2–11 Dec 2019	400	47	10	11	19	4	7	–	2	28
Research Affairs	3–17 Dec 2018	600	44	15	16	12	4	6	–	3	28
GMK	December 2018	?	45	15	17	12	4	6	–	1	28
2018 state election	25 February 2018	–	44.3	17.2	15.5	10.7	5.5	5.2	–	1.6	27.1

== Results ==
Party	Votes	%	+/−	Seats	+/−
Austrian People's Party (ÖVP)	119,167	34.71	–9.55	14	–3
Freedom Party of Austria (FPÖ)	64,683	18.84	+3.31	7	+2
Social Democratic Party of Austria (SPÖ)	60,009	17.48	+0.23	7	+1
Citizens' Forum Tyrol (FRITZ)	33,990	9.90	+4.44	3	+1
The Greens – The Green Alternative (GRÜNE)	31,598	9.20	–1.47	3	–1
NEOS – The New Austria (NEOS)	21,589	6.29	+1.08	2	±0
MFG Austria – People Freedom Fundamental Rights (MFG)	9,539	2.78	New	0	New
Communist Party of Austria (KPÖ)	2,312	0.67	New	0	New
Join In – The List for All Others (MACH MIT)	453	0.13	New	0	New
Invalid/blank votes	4,577	–	–	–	–
Total	347,917	100	–	36	0
Registered voters/turnout	535,112	65.02	+5.02	–	–
Source: Tyrolean Government

Popular vote
ÖVP	34.71%
FPÖ	18.84%
SPÖ	17.48%
FRITZ	9.90%
GRÜNE	9.20%
NEOS	6.29%
MFG	2.78%
Other	0.80%

Landtag seats
ÖVP	38.89%
FPÖ	19.44%
SPÖ	19.44%
FRITZ	8.33%
GRÜNE	8.33%
NEOS	5.56%

=== Results by constituency ===
Constituency	ÖVP		FPÖ		SPÖ		FRITZ		Grüne		NEOS		Others	Total seats	Turnout
Constituency	%	S	%	S	%	S	%	S	%	S	%	S	%	Total seats	Turnout
Innsbruck City	20.6		17.5		18.9		12.5		18.0		7.8		4.7		62.4
Imst	38.6		20.5		17.0		8.2		6.3		6.4		3.0		66.6
Innsbruck-Land	29.5		17.8		20.4		11.7		9.8		6.9		4.0		68.3
Kitzbühel	41.6		16.8		14.9		10.0		7.3		5.8		3.7		62.8
Kufstein	34.4		22.1		16.2		9.0		8.7		6.3		3.3		62.4
Landeck	55.3		13.5		14.6		5.1		4.2		4.5		2.9		69.9
Lienz	42.9		18.6		14.8		9.0		6.2		4.9		3.6		62.3
Reutte	42.7		19.5		13.5		8.2		6.9		6.2		3.1		64.2
Schwaz	37.4		22.3		17.6		8.7		6.3		5.1		2.5		64.6
Remaining seats															
Total	34.7	14	18.8	7	17.5	7	9.9	3	9.2	3	6.3	2	3.6	36	65.0
Source: Tyrolean Government

== Aftermath ==
On 3 October, the ÖVP decided to start coalition talks with the SPÖ. The new ÖVP-SPÖ government was sworn into office on 25 October 2022.
