= 2008 Tyrolean state election =

← 2003	8 June 2008	2013 →

All 36 seats in the Landtag of Tyrol 19 seats needed for a majority
- Turnout: 342,713 (65.8%) ▲4.9%
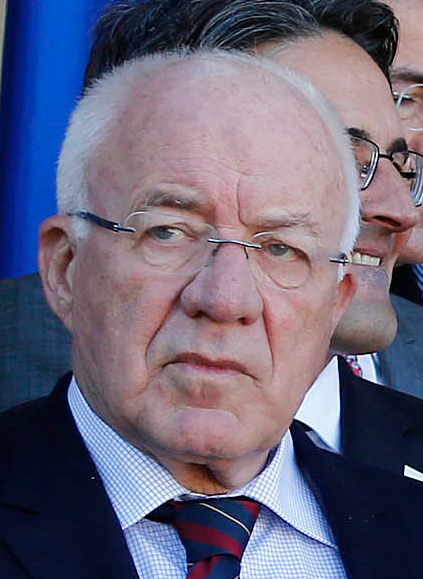

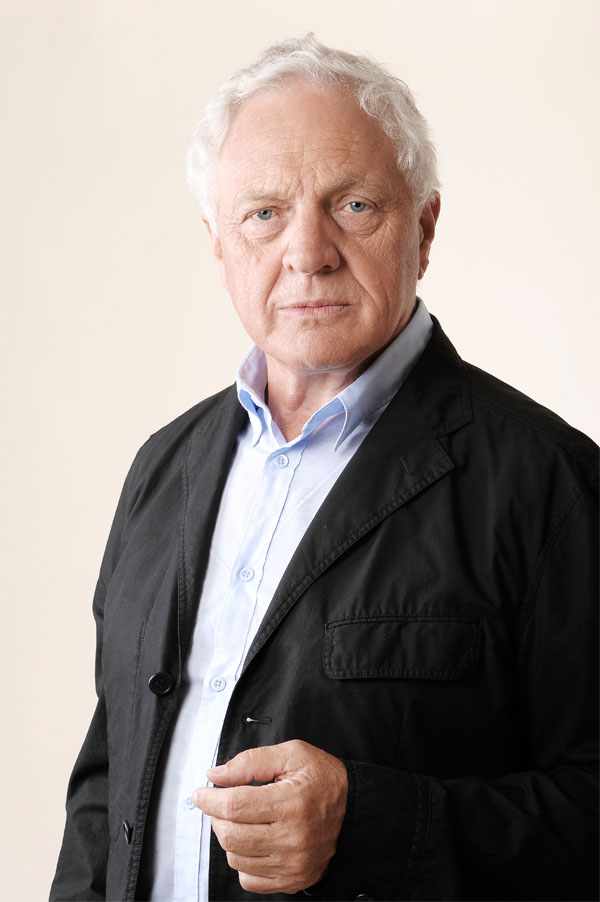
	First party	Second party	Third party
			SPÖ
Leader	Herwig van Staa	Fritz Dinkhauser	Hannes Gschwentner
Party	ÖVP	FRITZ	SPÖ
Last election	20 seats, 49.9%	Did not exist	9 seats, 25.9%
Seats won	16	7	5
Seat change	▼4	▲7	▼4
Popular vote	136,401	61,795	52,066
Percentage	40.5%	18.4%	15.5%
Swing	▼9.4%	New party	▼10.4%
	Fourth party	Fifth party
Leader	Gerald Hauser	Georg Willi
Party	FPÖ	Greens
Last election	2 seats, 8.0%	5 seats, 15.6%
Seats won	4	4
Seat change	▲2	▼1
Popular vote	41,788	36,136
Percentage	12.4%	10.7%
Swing	▲4.4%	▼4.9%
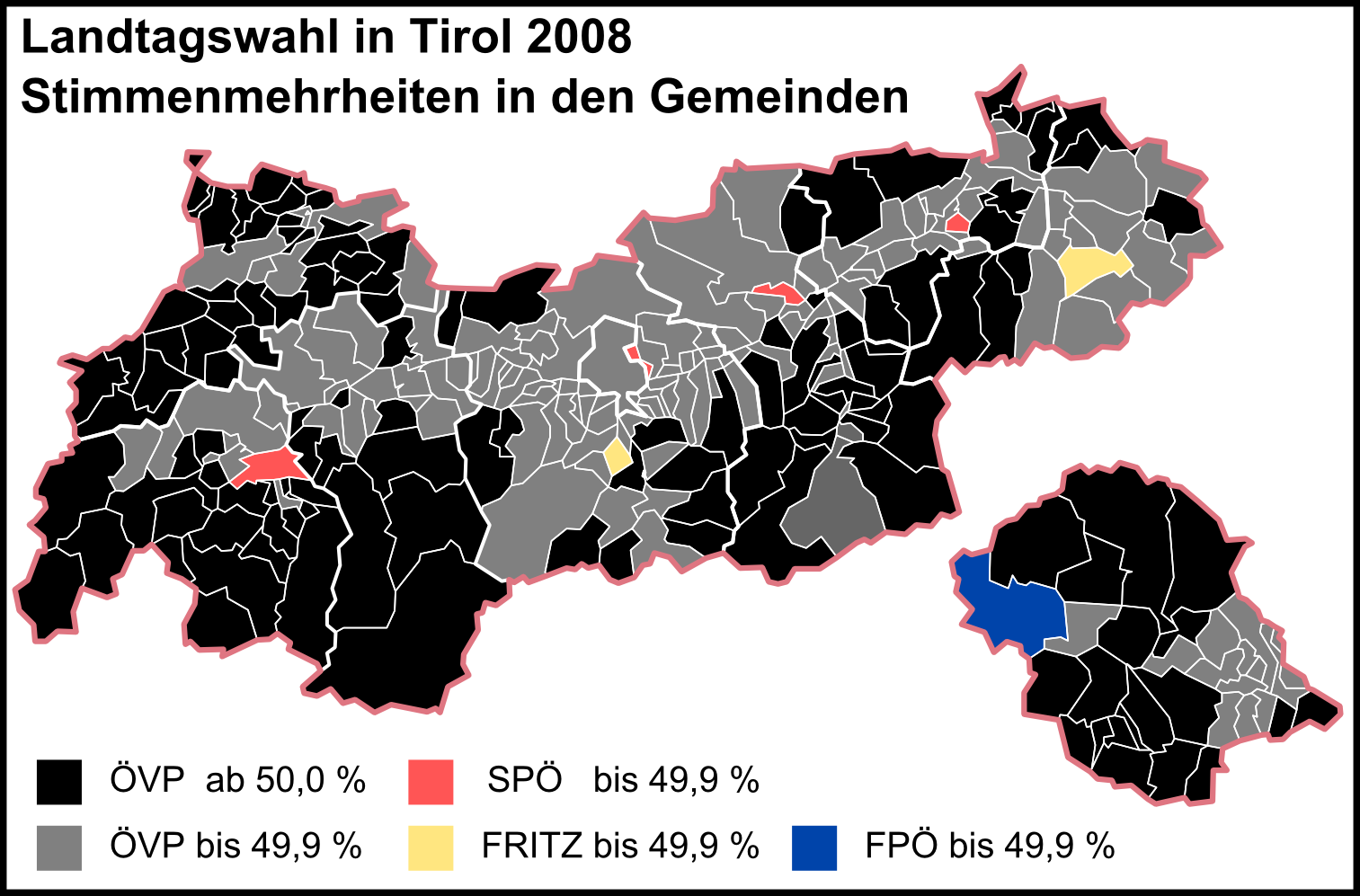
- Results by municipality. The lighter shade indicates a plurality; the darker shade indicates a majority.
Governor before election
Herwig van Staa
ÖVP
Elected Governor
Günther Platter
ÖVP

The 2008 Tyrolean state election was held on 8 June 2008 to elect the members of the Landtag of Tyrol.

The election saw major losses of almost ten percentage points for the governing Austrian People's Party (ÖVP) and Social Democratic Party of Austria (SPÖ), with each suffering its worst ever result up to this point. The ÖVP lost its absolute majority for only the second time in history, while the SPÖ fell to third place for the first time. The major winner of the election was the Fritz Dinkhauser List, which debuted at a strong 18.4%, immediately becoming the second largest party. The Freedom Party of Austria (FPÖ) made gains, while The Greens fell by almost five points compared to their best-ever result from 2003.

Despite its losses, the ÖVP under Governor Herwig van Staa remained by far the largest party. After leading post-election coalition negotiations, in which the ÖVP secured a coalition with the SPÖ, van Staa resigned and was replaced by Günther Platter on 23 June.

== Background ==
In the 2003 election, the ÖVP under new Governor Herwig van Staa regained its absolute majority, which it had lost in 1999. The SPÖ made gains, while the FPÖ lost more than half its voteshare. The Greens were the biggest winner, doubling their result to almost 16% and placing third. Despite its majority, the ÖVP chose to form a coalition with the SPÖ.

In 2008, Fritz Dinkhauser founded his own party in Tyrol, named the Fritz Dinkhauser List. Dinkhauser was chairman of the ÖAAB, the ÖVP-affiliated trade union association, and known for his criticism of his own party, including the ÖVP government of Herwig van Staa. With his new party, he promoted affordable housing, support for families, and improved education.

== Electoral system ==
The 36 seats of the Landtag of Tyrol are elected via open list proportional representation in a two-step process. The seats are distributed between nine multi-member constituencies, corresponding to the districts of Tyrol. For parties to receive any representation in the Landtag, they must either win at least one seat in a constituency directly, or clear a 5 percent state-wide electoral threshold. Seats are distributed in constituencies according to the Hare quota, with any remaining seats allocated using the D'Hondt method at the state level, to ensure overall proportionality between a party's vote share and its share of seats.

== Contesting parties ==
The table below lists parties represented in the previous Landtag.

Name		Ideology	Leader	2003 result	
Name		Ideology	Leader	Votes (%)	Seats
ÖVP	Austrian People's Party; Österreichische Volkspartei	Christian democracy	Herwig van Staa	49.9%	20 / 36
SPÖ	Social Democratic Party of Austria; Sozialdemokratische Partei Österreichs	Social democracy	Hannes Gschwentner	25.9%	9 / 36
GRÜNE	The Greens – The Green Alternative; Die Grünen – Die Grüne Alternative	Green politics	Georg Willi	15.6%	5 / 36
FPÖ	Freedom Party of Austria; Freiheitliche Partei Österreichs	Right-wing populism Euroscepticism	Gerald Hauser	8.0%	2 / 36

In addition to the parties already represented in the Landtag, three parties collected enough signatures to be placed on the ballot.

- Fritz Dinkhauser List (FRITZ)
- The Christians (DC)
- Communist Party of Austria (KPÖ)

== Results ==
Party	Votes	%	+/−	Seats	+/−
Austrian People's Party (ÖVP)	136,401	40.50	–9.39	16	–4
Fritz Dinkhauser List (FRITZ)	61,795	18.35	New	7	New
Social Democratic Party of Austria (SPÖ)	52,066	15.46	–10.39	5	–4
Freedom Party of Austria (FPÖ)	41,788	12.41	+4.44	4	+2
The Greens – The Green Alternative (GRÜNE)	36,136	10.73	–4.86	4	–1
The Christians (DC)	4,699	1.40	New	0	New
Communist Party of Austria (KPÖ)	3,896	1.16	+0.46	0	±0
Invalid/blank votes	5,932	–	–	–	–
Total	342,713	100	–	36	0
Registered voters/turnout	520,527	65.84	+4.93	–	–
Source: Tyrolean Government

Popular vote
ÖVP	40.50%
FRITZ	18.35%
SPÖ	15.46%
FPÖ	12.41%
GRÜNE	10.73%
Other	2.56%

Landtag seats
ÖVP	44.44%
FRITZ	19.44%
SPÖ	13.89%
FPÖ	11.11%
GRÜNE	11.11%

=== Results by constituency ===
Constituency	ÖVP		FRITZ		SPÖ		FPÖ		Grüne		Others	Total seats	Turnout
Constituency	%	S	%	S	%	S	%	S	%	S	%	Total seats	Turnout
Innsbruck City	28.5	1	20.2	1	14.6		13.3		20.4	1	2.9	3	58.5
Imst	48.3	1	14.4		16.4		10.8		7.5		2.7	1	67.7
Innsbruck-Land	36.0	3	21.6	1	15.1	1	12.4	1	12.2	1	2.7	7	68.7
Kitzbühel	42.7	1	19.0		16.4		12.4		7.5		2.1	1	64.8
Kufstein	39.9	2	17.0		17.3		15.1		8.8		2.0	2	66.8
Landeck	50.9	1	12.7		18.3		9.3		5.9		2.9	1	68.9
Lienz	48.8	1	13.1		12.6		14.4		8.8		0.9	1	67.7
Reutte	55.8	1	17.0		10.0		7.5		6.7		3.0	1	67.6
Schwaz	41.6	1	20.5		16.4		11.4		7.7		2.3	1	65.4
Remaining seats		4		5		4		3		2		18	
Total	40.5	16	18.4	7	15.5	5	12.4	4	10.7	4	2.6	36	65.8
Source: Tyrolean Government

== Aftermath ==
During the election campaign, Governor van Staa had stated he would resign if the ÖVP fell below 40% of votes. The party narrowly exceeded this threshold, and van Staa was re-affirmed as ÖVP leader by the party after the election. However, his presence was a stumbling block in coalition negotiations, as both the Fritz list and Greens desired his resignation. The ÖVP thus sought to form government with the SPÖ instead; a coalition agreement was finalised on 23 June. However, van Staa announced on the same day that he would indeed resign. His successor was Günther Platter, who became the new Governor.

The SPÖ's disastrous result, following losses in the recent Graz local election, compounded pressure on federal Chancellor Alfred Gusenbauer. He was replaced as federal SPÖ chairman a week after the election, and ultimately resigned as Chancellor in December.
