= 2013 Tyrolean state election =

← 2008	28 April 2013	2018 →

All 36 seats in the Landtag of Tyrol 19 seats needed for a majority
- Turnout: 321,611 (60.4%) ▼5.4%
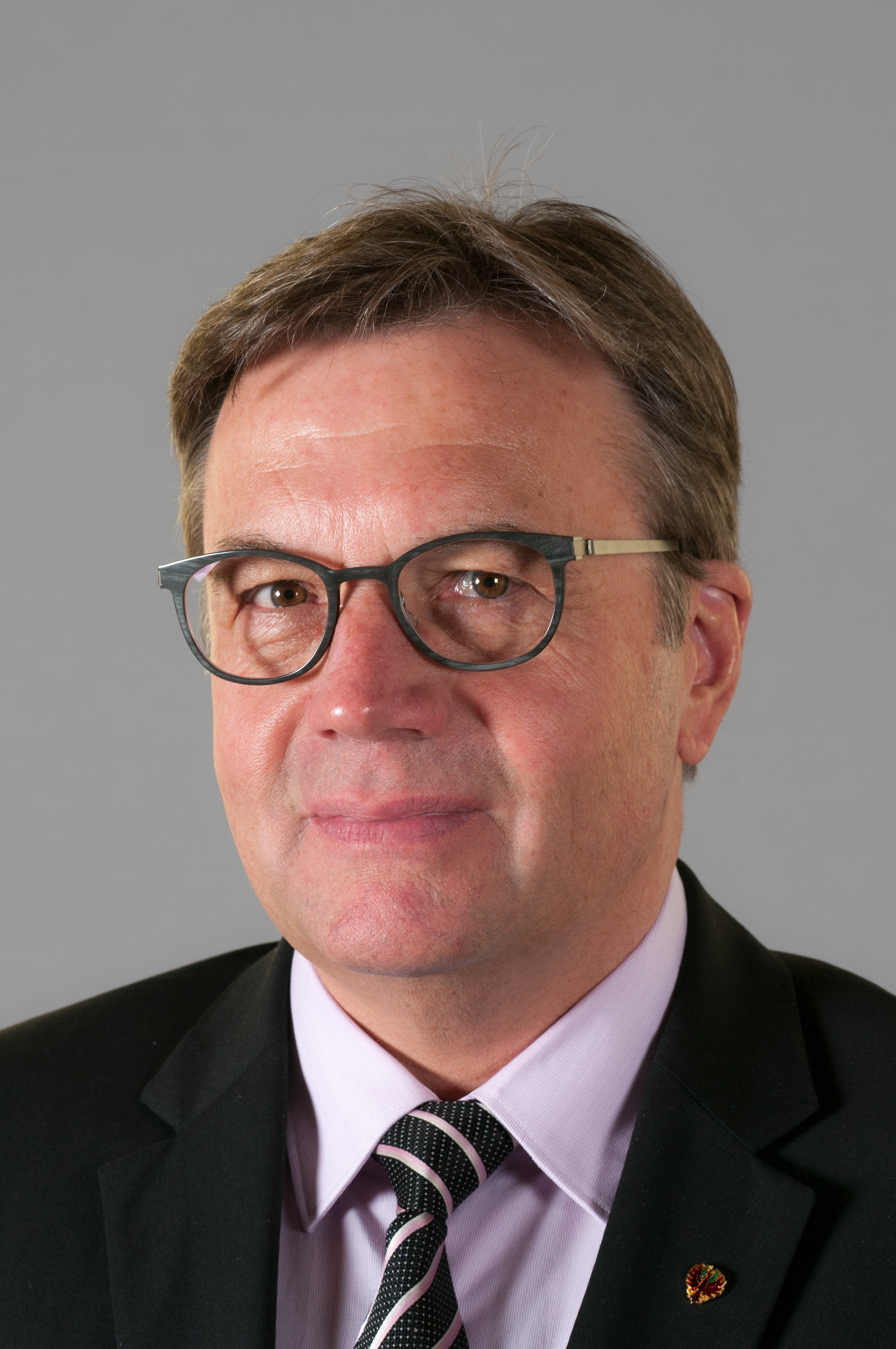

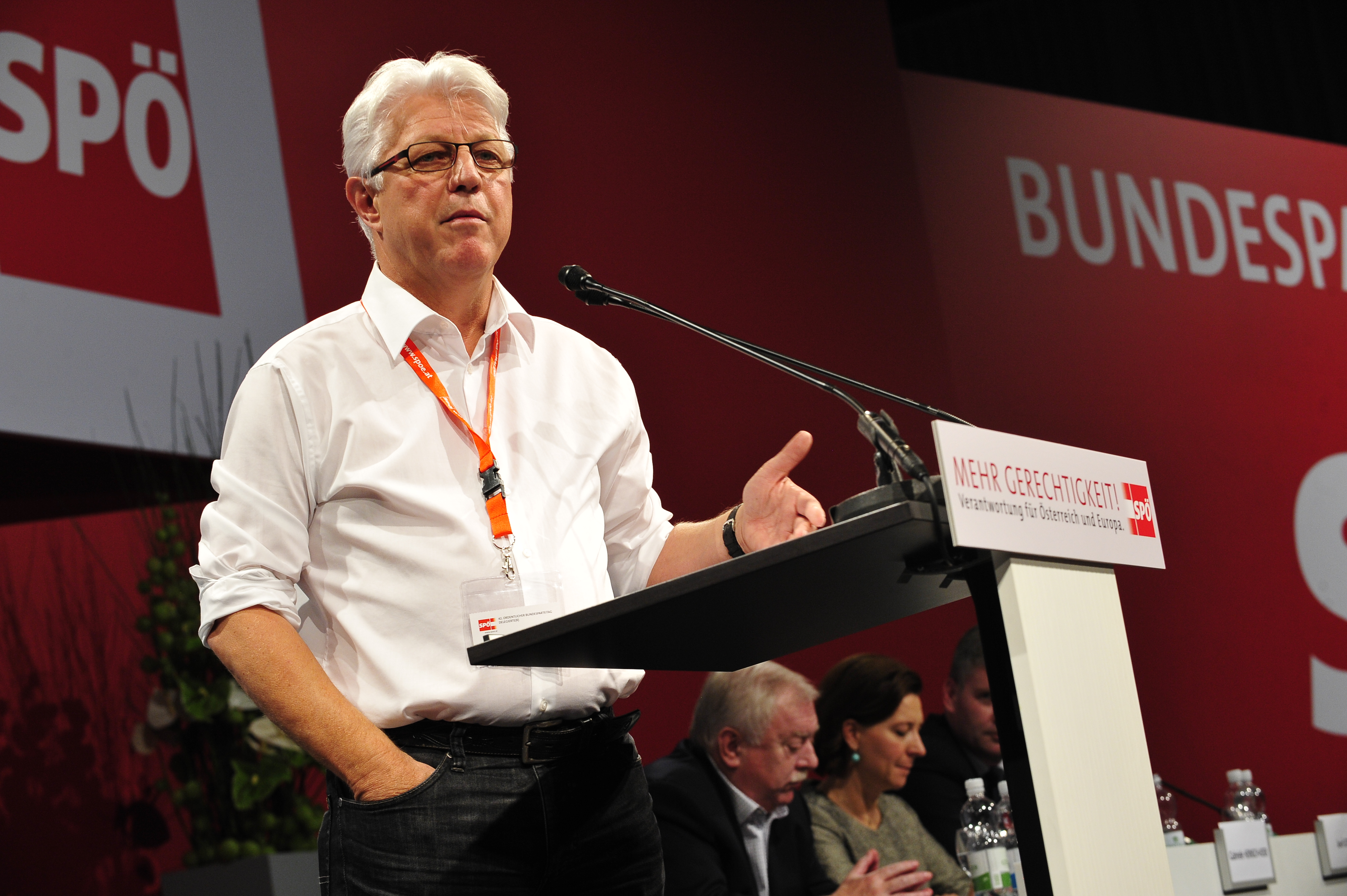

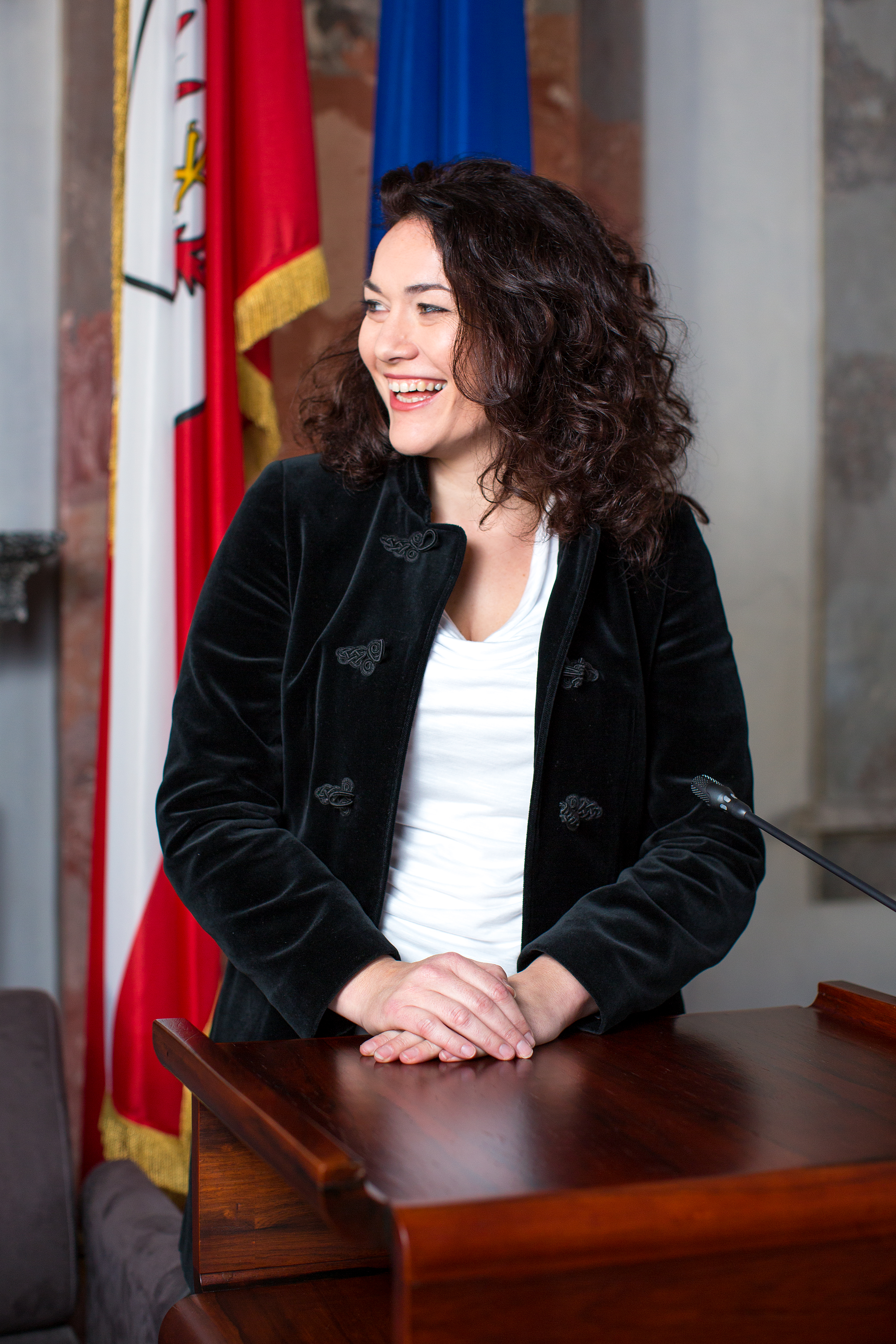
	First party	Second party	Third party
Leader	Günther Platter	Gerhard Reheis	Ingrid Felipe
Party	ÖVP	SPÖ	Greens
Last election	16 seats, 40.5%	5 seats, 15.5%	4 seats, 10.7%
Seats won	16	5	5
Seat change	0	0	▲1
Popular vote	124,689	43,469	39,904
Percentage	39.4%	13.7%	12.6%
Swing	▼1.1%	▼1.7%	▲1.9%
	Fourth party	Fifth party	Sixth party
Leader	Anna Hosp & Hans Lindenberger	Gerald Hauser	Andrea Haselwanter-Schneider
Party	Forward	FPÖ	FRITZ
Last election	Did not exist	4 seats, 12.4%	7 seats, 18.4%
Seats won	4	4	2
Seat change	▲4	0	▼5
Popular vote	30,229	29,594	17,785
Percentage	9.5%	9.3%	5.6%
Swing	New party	▼3.1%	▼12.7%
- Results by municipality. The lighter shade indicates a plurality; the darker shade indicates a majority.
Governor before election
Günther Platter
ÖVP
Elected Governor
Günther Platter
ÖVP

The 2013 Tyrolean state election was held on 28 April 2013 to elect the members of the Landtag of Tyrol.

The election was contested by a large number of parties and saw a significant shift in support between them. The governing Austrian People's Party (ÖVP) Social Democratic Party of Austria (SPÖ), while suffering relatively small losses, each suffered their worst results in history. The Greens finished in third place just 1.1 percentage points behind the SPÖ, while the Freedom Party of Austria (FPÖ) suffered a downswing. The most notable loss of the election was the Fritz Dinkhauser List, which collapsed from a second-placed 18% in 2008 to just 5.6% in this election, making it the smallest party in the Landtag. Three new parties were considered contenders to enter the Landtag, though only one succeeded, with Forward Tyrol winning 9.5% and four seats. The Citizens' Club Tyrol, a splinter from the Fritz party, narrowly failed to win seats, as did Team Stronach.

Despite its relatively poor result, the ÖVP under Governor Günther Platter remained by far the largest party. He subsequently formed a coalition with the Greens.

== Background ==
In the 2008 election, the ÖVP lost its majority for the first time in history, winning 40.5% of votes cast (a loss of 9.4pp). This was coupled with losses for the SPÖ and Greens, while the new Fritz Dinkhauser List soared to second place with 18.4% of votes. The ÖVP subsequently formed a coalition with the SPÖ.

== Electoral system ==
The 36 seats of the Landtag of Tyrol are elected via open list proportional representation in a two-step process. The seats are distributed between nine multi-member constituencies, corresponding to the districts of Tyrol. For parties to receive any representation in the Landtag, they must either win at least one seat in a constituency directly, or clear a 5 percent state-wide electoral threshold. Seats are distributed in constituencies according to the Hare quota, with any remaining seats allocated using the D'Hondt method at the state level, to ensure overall proportionality between a party's vote share and its share of seats.

== Contesting parties ==
The table below lists parties represented in the previous Landtag.

Name		Ideology	Leader	2008 result	
Name		Ideology	Leader	Votes (%)	Seats
ÖVP	Austrian People's Party; Österreichische Volkspartei	Christian democracy	Günther Platter	40.5%	16 / 36
FRITZ	Citizens' Forum Tyrol; Bürgerforum Tirol	Populism	Andrea Haselwanter-Schneider	18.4%	7 / 36
SPÖ	Social Democratic Party of Austria; Sozialdemokratische Partei Österreichs	Social democracy	Gerhard Reheis	15.5%	5 / 36
FPÖ	Freedom Party of Austria; Freiheitliche Partei Österreichs	Right-wing populism Euroscepticism	Gerald Hauser	12.4%	4 / 36
GRÜNE	The Greens – The Green Alternative; Die Grünen – Die Grüne Alternative	Green politics	Ingrid Felipe	10.7%	4 / 36

In addition to the parties already represented in the Landtag, six parties collected enough signatures to be placed on the ballot.

- Forward Tyrol (VORWÄRTS)
- Citizens' Club Tyrol (GURGISER)
- Team Stronach (STRONACH)
- For Tyrol (FÜR TIROL)
- Communist Party of Austria (KPÖ)
- Pirate Party of Austria (PIRAT)

== Opinion polling ==
Polling firm	Fieldwork date	Sample size	ÖVP	FRITZ	SPÖ	FPÖ	Grüne	Stro.	Club	Forw.	Others	Lead
2018 state election	25 February 2018	–	39.4	5.6	13.7	9.3	12.6	3.4	4.8	9.5	1.6	25.7
GMK	10–12 Apr 2013	500	38	4	14	10	9	6	6	10	1.5	24
Gallup	April 2013	?	33	5	15	9	15	4	4	12	–	18
Karmasin	26 Mar–5 Apr 2013	500	34	6	14	10	14	6	2	11	3	20
TrendCom	13–19 Mar 2013	400	34	6	16	8	12	6	2	13	3	18
Market	March 2013	?	36	7	14	10	13	8	2	8	1	22
Karmasin	March 2013	500	35	5	15	9	14	6	2	9	3	20
IMAD	13–16 Mar 2013	500	30.5	6.5	13.7	8.5	14.0	6.5	2.5	13.4	4.4	16.5
Karmasin	February 2013	?	36	4	15	11	13	5	2	10	4	21
Karmasin	December 2012	?	41	7	15	9	14	8	2	–	4	26
2008 state election	8 June 2008	–	40.5	18.4	15.5	12.4	10.7	–	–	–	2.6	22.1

== Results ==
Party	Votes	%	+/−	Seats	+/−
Austrian People's Party (ÖVP)	124,689	39.35	–1.15	16	±0
Social Democratic Party of Austria (SPÖ)	43,469	13.72	–1.74	5	±0
The Greens – The Green Alternative (GRÜNE)	39,904	12.59	+1.86	5	+1
Forward Tyrol (VORWÄRTS)	30,229	9.54	New	4	New
Freedom Party of Austria (FPÖ)	29,594	9.34	–3.07	4	±0
Fritz Dinkhauser List – Citizens' Forum Tyrol (FRITZ)	17,785	5.61	–12.74	2	–5
Citizens' Club Tyrol (GURGISER)	15,326	4.84	New	0	New
Team Stronach (STRONACH)	10,637	3.36	New	0	New
For Tyrol (FUR)	2,322	0.73	New	0	New
Communist Party of Austria (KPÖ)	1,690	0.53	–0.63	0	±0
Pirate Party of Austria (PIRAT)	1,207	0.38	+0.38	0	±0
Invalid/blank votes	4,759	–	–	–	–
Total	321,611	100	–	36	0
Registered voters/turnout	532,496	60.40	–5.44	–	–
Source: Tyrolean Government

Popular vote
ÖVP	39.35%
SPÖ	13.72%
GRÜNE	12.59%
VORWÄRTS	9.54%
FPÖ	9.34%
FRITZ	5.61%
GURGISER	4.84%
STRONACH	3.36%
Other	1.64%

Landtag seats
ÖVP	44.44%
SPÖ	13.89%
GRÜNE	13.89%
VORWÄRTS	11.11%
FPÖ	11.11%
FRITZ	5.56%

=== Results by constituency ===
Constituency	ÖVP		SPÖ		Grüne		Forward		FPÖ		FRITZ		Citizens Club		Others	Total seats	Turnout
Constituency	%	S	%	S	%	S	%	S	%	S	%	S	%	S	%	Total seats	Turnout
Innsbruck City	22.6	1	15.5	1	24.6	1	7.8		11.8		6.9		5.1		5.7	3	54.2
Imst	48.7	1	15.6		7.9		8.7		7.0		5.4		3.1		3.5	1	62.5
Innsbruck-Land	35.0	2	13.3	1	15.0	1	9.4		8.8		7.1		6.1		5.3	4	61.8
Kitzbühel	44.9	1	12.9		9.0		8.3		9.4		5.3		3.6		6.5	1	58.2
Kufstein	39.4	2	14.1		10.5		7.7		11.6		5.2		5.7		5.9	2	59.5
Landeck	55.8	1	14.6		6.2		9.1		5.6		4.3		2.1		2.3	1	66.2
Lienz	49.5	1	14.3		7.9		7.9		11.0		3.3		1.6		4.6	1	63.9
Reutte	37.2		6.3		7.0		33.3		4.7		2.3		5.9		3.4	0	65.9
Schwaz	43.6	1	13.2		9.6		7.5		9.5		5.2		6.6		4.9	1	60.0
Remaining seats		6		3		3		4		4		2		–		22	
Total	39.4	16	13.7	5	12.6	5	9.5	4	9.3	4	5.6	2	4.8	0	5.0	36	60.4
Source: Tyrolean Government
