= Alois Partl =

Austrian politician (born 1929)

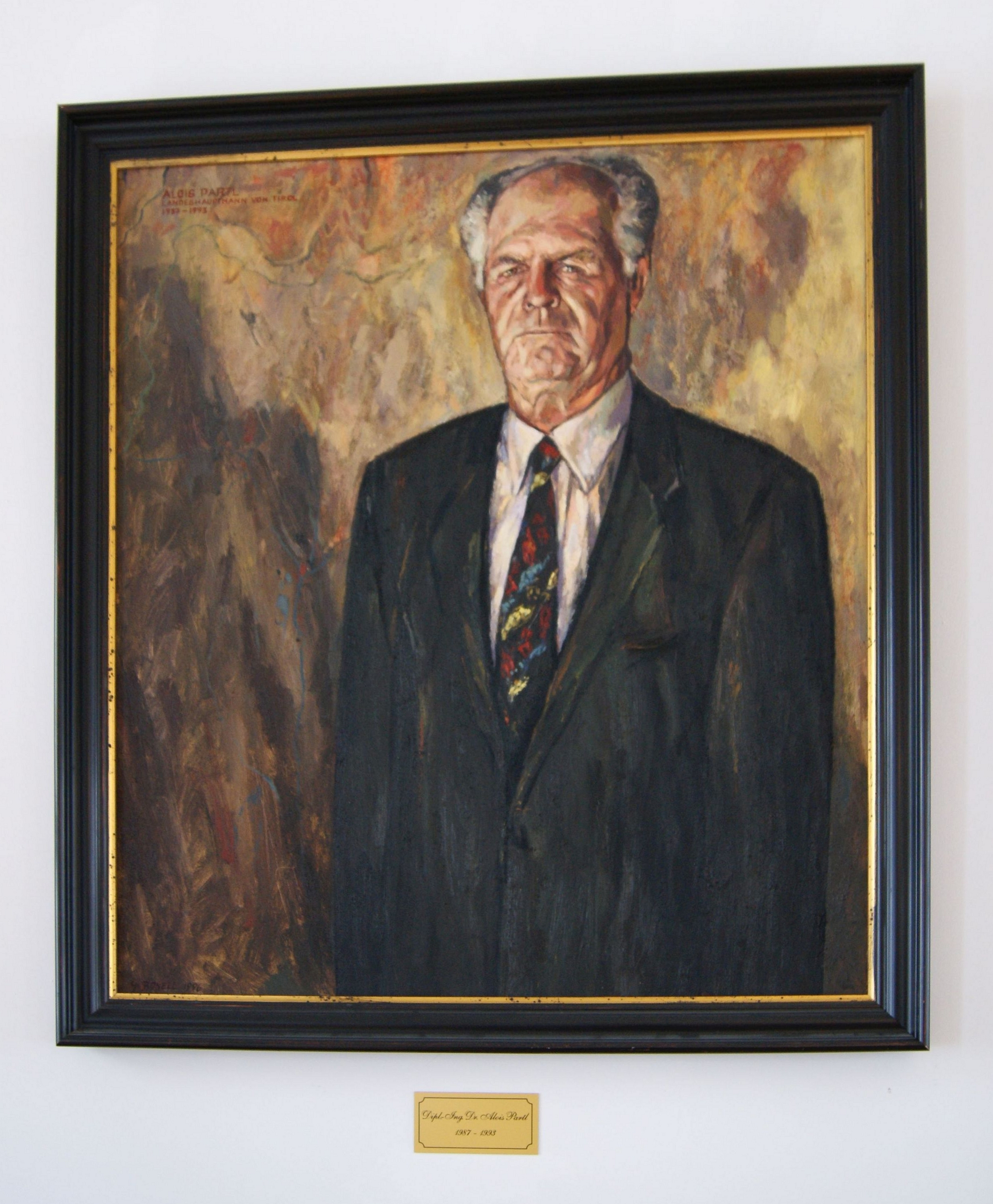

Governor of Tyrol
- In office March 5, 1987 – September 24, 1993
- Preceded by: Eduard Wallnöfer
- Succeeded by: Wendelin Weingartner

Personal details
- Born: 13 January 1929; Kematen, Austria
- Political party: Austrian People's Party

Alois Partl (born 13 January 1929) is a former Austrian politician. He was the governor of Tyrol and the head of the Tyrolean People's Party. Partl succeeded Eduard Wallnöfer as leader of the Austrian People's Party (ÖVP) in Tyrol and was the governor of Tyrol from 5 March 1987 to 24 September 1993.
