= Forward Tyrol =

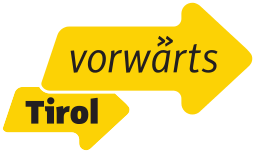
- Leader: Anna Hosp Hans Lindenberger Christine Oppitz-Plörer
- Founded: 2013
- Ideology: Tyrol regionalism

Forward Tyrol (German: Vorwärts Tirol) is an Austrian political party active in Tyrol. It was founded by Anna Hosp (ÖVP), Hans Lindenberger (SPÖ) and Christine Oppitz-Plörer (ÖVP) in the run-up of the 2013 state election. In the election the party obtained 9.3% of the vote and four members of the local Landtag.
