= Wendelin Weingartner =

Austrian politician (born 1937)

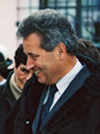
- Weingartner in 2001

Governor of Tyrol
- In office 24 September 1993 – 26 October 2002
- Preceded by: Alois Partl
- Succeeded by: Herwig van Staa

Personal details
- Born: 7 February 1937 (age 89) Innsbruck, Austria
- Party: ÖVP

Wendelin Weingartner (born 7 February 1937) is an Austrian politician who served as the Governor of Tyrol from 1993 to 2002. He studied law at the University of Innsbruck, and was the Chairman of the Landes-Hypothekenbank Steiermark in 1984.
