= Herwig van Staa =

Austrian politician (born 1942)

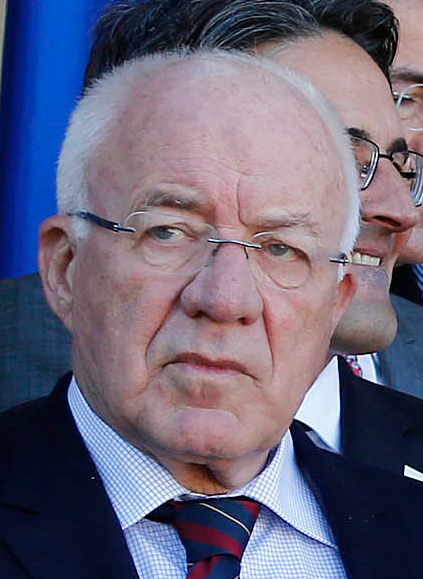
- van Staa in 2014

Governor of Tyrol
- In office 26 October 2002 – 1 July 2008
- Preceded by: Wendelin Weingartner
- Succeeded by: Günther Platter

Personal details
- Born: 10 June 1942 (age 83) Linz, Reichsgau Oberdonau, Nazi Germany (now Upper Austria, Austria)
- Party: ÖVP

Herwig van Staa (born 10 June 1942) was the governor of Tyrol from 2002 to 2008.

Van Staa was born in Linz, Upper Austria. His father, who came from the Rhine area, worked as a technician in the steelworks in Linz and died in a sick bay in 1943 after military action on the Eastern Front. His mother came from an Austrian family and worked as a midwife. Van Staa attended primary school in Bad Leonfelden (Mühlviertel) and completed his secondary school studies in Wels, where he passed his 'A' levels in 1960.

== Academic life ==
Van Staa has been living in Innsbruck since 1960. He studied law, social and economic science, folklore, sociology and medicine. He completed his studies with the following titles: PhD, LLD., Mag.rer.soc.oec. During his studies, he was an active member in Catholic organisations and held a mandate of the Austrian Students' Association. He also took an active part in social and environmental issues. He was co-founder and first chairman of the Association for Construction and Promotion of Health and Social Districts in Tyrol.

From 1970 onwards, van Staa was managing director of the Institute for Rural Development, working especially in the field of social and regional research. In 1974, he became university assistant at the Institute for Alpine Agriculture and Forestry at the University of Innsbruck and has been assistant professor and head of this institute since 1980. Assisted by Ing. Josef Willi, he established the internationally renowned Research Department for Agricultural Ecology at the Institute. Since 1976, he has also been a contract teacher for social science at the Academy of Social Work.

== Political life ==
In 1989, van Staa was elected member of the town council of Innsbruck. In December 1993, together with other like-minded members of this council, he founded the political association For Innsbruck. On 24 April 1994, the next elections of the municipal council of Innsbruck took place. Van Staa and his For Innsbruck movement came out as surprising winners and, as a result, he was elected mayor of Innsbruck by the town council with a majority of 35 out of 40 votes.

In spring 1995, van Staa was elected vice president of the Austrian Towns Association. Since July 1995, he has been president of the Austrian Town Platform for the Austrian People's Party and president of the European Local and Regional Government Association of the European People's Party.

In July 1996, van Staa was elected vice president of the Chamber of Local Authorities of the Congress of the Council of Europe. In 1998, he became president of the Chamber of Local Authorities of the Congress, and in May, 2002, President of the Congress. Since May 2004 he has served as past president of the Congress.

In October 2002, he was elected governor of the Tyrol Region; in October 2003 he was re-elected governor. Since February 2004, he has been vice president of the Committee of the Regions and leader of the Austrian delegation.

In the 2008 state election, he was ousted as Governor of Tyrol by Günther Platter, but went on to be elected President of the regional parliament (Landtag).

He is imperial Knight of Honor of the Order of St. George.
