= Dominik Oberhofer =

Austrian politician (born 1980)

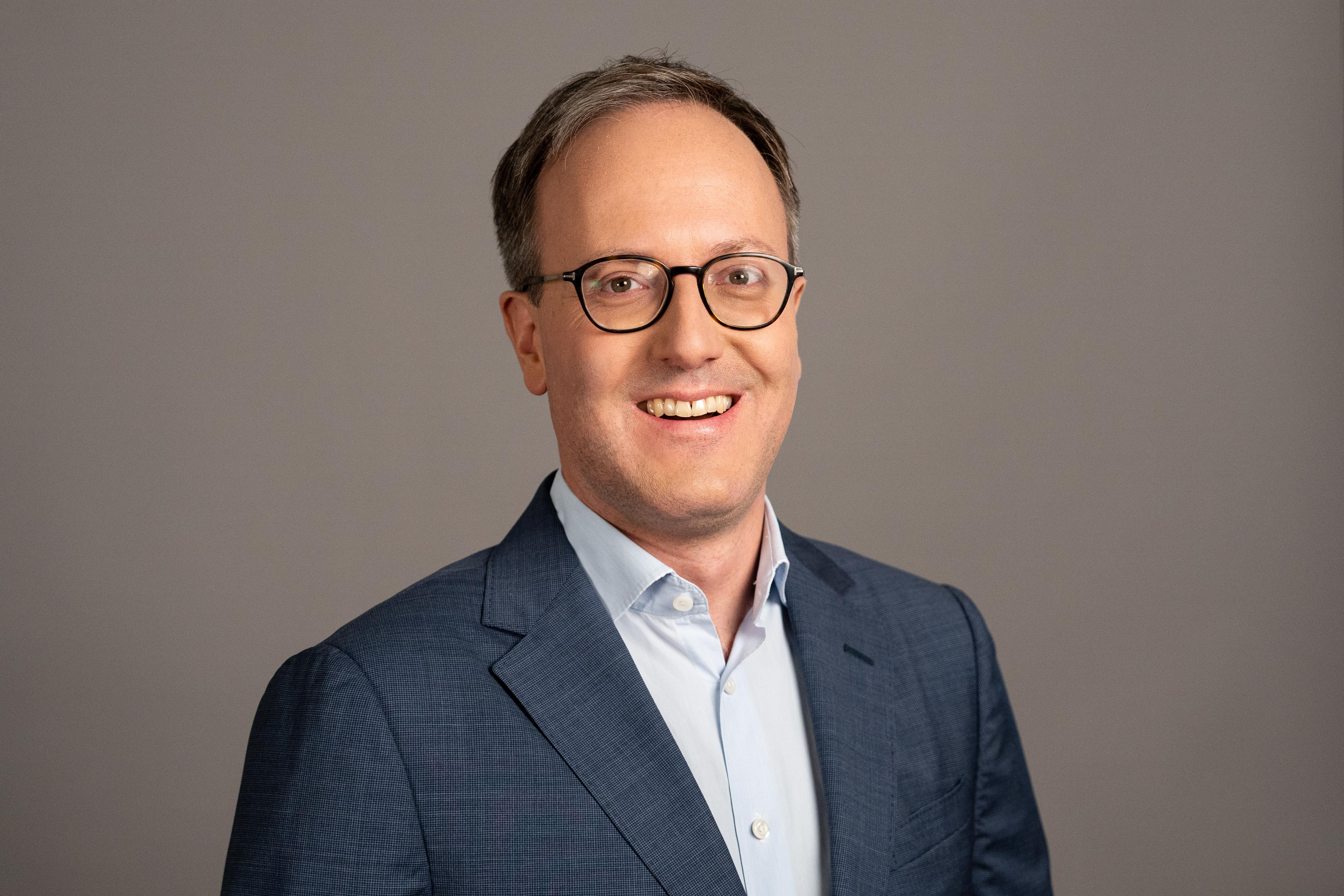
- Oberhofer in 2022

Member of the National Council
- Incumbent
- Assumed office 24 October 2024
- Constituency: Tyrol

Personal details
- Born: 14 July 1980 (age 45)
- Party: NEOS

Dominik Oberhofer (born 14 July 1980) is an Austrian politician of NEOS serving as a member of the National Council since 2024. From 2018 to 2024, he was a member of the Tyrolean Landtag.
