= Anton Mattle =

Austrian politician (born 1963)

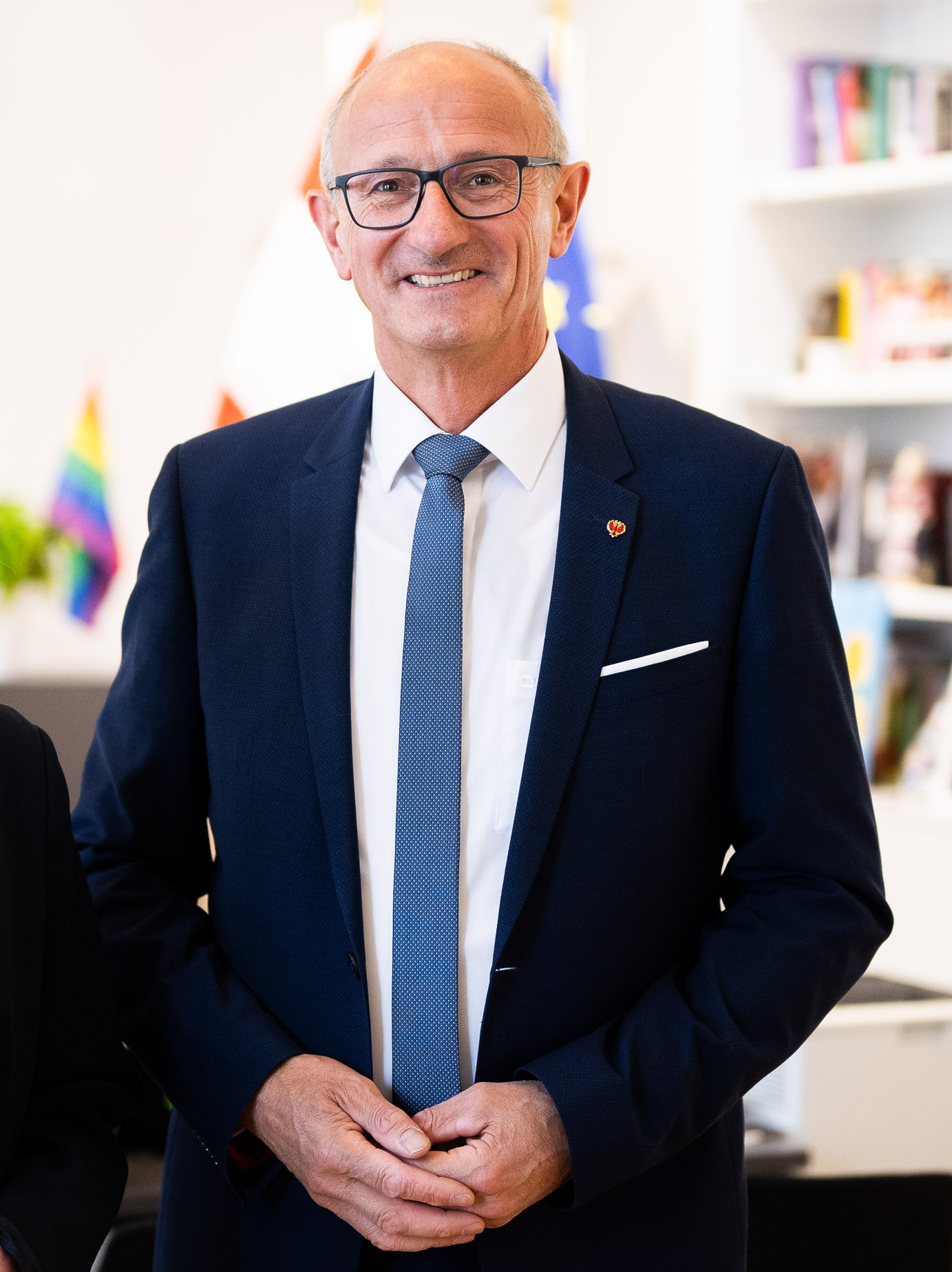

Governor of Tyrol
- Incumbent
- Assumed office October 25, 2022
- Chancellor: Christian Stocker; Alexander Schallenberg (acting); Karl Nehammer; Alexander Schallenberg
- Preceded by: Günther Platter

Personal details
- Born: 10 March 1963 (age 62); Zams, Austria
- Political party: Austrian People's Party

Anton Mattle (born 10 March 1963) is an Austrian politician from Zams. He succeeded Günther Platter as leader of the Austrian People's Party (ÖVP) and has been the governor of Tyrol since 25 October 2022.
