= Citizens' Forum Austria =

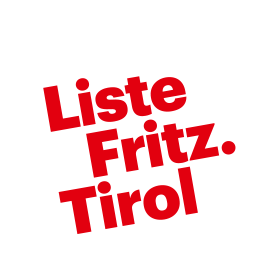
- Leader: Andrea Haselwanter-Schneider
- Founded: 2008
- Split from: Austrian People's Party
- Ideology: Tyrol regionalism; Decentralization; Anti-corruption
- European affiliation: European Democratic Party
- National Council: 0 / 183
- Federal Council: 0 / 60
- European Parliament: 0 / 19
- State Parliaments: 3 / 440

Website
- listefritz.at

The Citizens' Forum Austria (German: Bürgerforum Österreich, FRITZ) is an Austrian political party mainly active in Tyrol. It was founded by president of the Tyrolean branch of the Austrian Chamber of Labour Fritz Dinkhauser (an Austrian People's Party member before that), who was joined by the popular anti-transit activist Fritz Gurgiser of the Transitforum Austria-Tirol. At the 2008 state election, the Citizens' Forum stood under the name Fritz Dinkhauser List – Citizens' Forum Tyrol (German: Liste Fritz Dinkhauser − Bürgerforum Tirol, FRITZ) and got 18.3% of the vote, thus becoming the second-largest party with seven seats. The party contested the 2008 early national election as well, but received only 1.76% of the vote and failed to obtain any seats. In the 2013 state election, the Citizens' Forum garnered 5.64% of the vote, winning only two seats in the state legislature. In the 2018 state election, it received 5.46% of the vote, keeping its two seats. In the 2019 Austrian legislative election they endorsed the Peter Pilz List JETZT. In the 2022 state election, the party received 9.9% of the vote, receiving 3 seats.

== Ideology ==
In the 2008 state election in Tyrol, List Fritz Dinkhauser focused on “fair distribution, the ending of rope teams and a policy that focuses on the people and not the powerful” as its central topics. The goals of the list included political, economic and social renewal, the fight against abuse of power, an education offensive, affordable housing, family support, social security and the promotion of culture and tradition. Furthermore, the List Fritz Dinkhauser called for the federal states and municipalities to be strengthened against the centralization tendencies of the federal government and the reduction in electricity prices, and the return of land to the agricultural communities.

Old Logo
