= Peter Goldgruber =

General Secretary of the Interior
- In office 18 December 2017 – 21 May 2019
- Minister: Herbert Kickl
- Preceded by: Office established
- Succeeded by: Vacant

Personal details
- Born: 20 October 1960 (age 65) Austria
- Party: Independent

Peter Goldgruber (born 20 October 1960) is an Austrian functionary who served as the first General Secretary of the Ministry of the Interior. He assumed his office after the first Kurz government was sworn in. Following the Ibiza affair, Interior Minister Kickl appointed Goldgruber acting Director General for the Public Security.

Goldgruber is the suspected leak in warning alt right activist Martin Sellner before Austrian police raided his home in March 2019, so he had enough time to delete his friendly emails with terrorist Brenton Tarrant, perpetrator of the Christchurch mosque shootings, 40 minutes before the raid; unusually, police waited 12 minutes for him to open the door. Sellner apparently had been warned and managed to delete all emails .
