= BAK (Austria) =

Anti-corruption bureau

The Bundesamt zur Korruptionsprävention und Korruptionsbekämpfung (Federal Bureau to prevent and to fight corruption), abbreviated BAK, was established as of January 1, 2010 at the Ministry of the Interior. It is the succeeding institution of the hitherto existing Büro für Interne Angelegenheiten (Bureau for Internal Affairs) (BIA), that had to be reorganized.

== Organization ==
The BAK is organized outside the section II of the Directorate General for Public Security (GDföS) and is primarily responsible to anticipate, prevent and combat corruption. Furthermore, there is a close cooperation with the Wirtschafts- und Korruptionsstaatsanwaltschaft (State Prosecutor against white collar crime and corruption), abbreviated WKSta. These include international police cooperation, assistance and cooperation with the competent bodies of the European Union and with the investigating authorities of the EU Member States. There is also contact person for OLAF, Interpol, Europol and other similar international organizations. As of 2017 BAK employed approximately 120 employees.

The BAK is divided into three divisions:

- Division 1 - Resources, Support, Law
- Division 2 - Prevention, Education, and International Cooperation
- Division 3 - Operational Service

The BAK is chaired by the Director or, in his absence by the Deputy Director. These are after a hearing by the President of Constitutional Court, the Supreme Administrative Court and Supreme Court for a term of five years appointed by the Interior Minister, reappointments are possible. Every chargeable avocation is the Directorate prohibited, with the exception of publications and activities in the field of teaching. The first director of BAK, Andreas Wieselthaler, was appointed on 8 February 2010.

== Corruption offenses ==
The BAK is gem. § 4 para 1 BAK-G nationwide responsible for the following offenses:

- Abuse of office (§ 302) Penal Code
- Bribery (§ 304 Penal Code)
- Bribes (§ 305 PC)
- Bribes to influence (§ 306 PC)
- Bribery (§ 307 PC)
- Benefit allowance (§ 307a StGB)
- Advantage allowance for influencing (§ 307b of the Criminal Code),
- Prohibited intervention (§ 308 PC)
- Violation of official secrecy (§ 310 Penal Code)
- Violations §18 Information Procedure Act (BGBl. Nr. 102/2014),
- Infidelity by taking advantage of an official position or with the participation of a public official (§§ 153 para. 2 second case, 313 or in conjunction with § 74 para 1 no. 4 of the Criminal Code)
- Acceptance of gifts by rulers (§ 153a StGB)
- Competitive agreements in procurement procedures (§ 168b of the Criminal Code) and serious fraud (§ 147 StGB) and commercial air fraud (§ 148 StGB) on the basis of such consultation
- Acceptance of gifts and bribing servants or agents (§ 309 Penal Code)
- Certain cases of money laundering (§ 165 StGB)
- Offenses under the Criminal Code as well as according to the criminal Nebengesetzen if they comply with one of the aforementioned offenses in context and where these are to follow on the written request of a court or prosecutor's office by the Federal Office,
- Offenses under the Criminal Code as well as according to the criminal Nebengesetzen by officials of the MoI, where these are to follow on the written request of a court or prosecutor's office by the Federal Office.
