= Federal Criminal Police Office =

Federal Criminal Police Office, or Bundeskriminalamt (a German language compound noun literally meaning "Federal Criminal Office"), can refer to:

- Federal Criminal Police Office (Germany)
- Federal Criminal Police Office (Austria)
