= Bundespolizei =

Bundespolizei (German: 'Federal Police') may refer to:

- Federal Police (Germany)
- Federal Police (Austria)
