= EKO Cobra =

Austrian police tactical unit

Einsatzkommando Cobra (Austrian German)
- Patch of EKO Cobra
- Active: 1978–present
- Country: Austria
- Agency: Federal Ministry of the Interior
- Type: Police tactical unit
- Operations jurisdiction: National
- Headquarters: Wiener Neustadt, Austria
- Common name: EKO Cobra

Structure
- Operators: 450

EKO Cobra (Austrian German: Einsatzkommando Cobra; "Special Intervention Unit Cobra") is a police tactical unit of the Austrian Federal Ministry of the Interior. EKO Cobra is not part of the Austrian Federal Police, but instead is part of the Directorate for Special Units/Special Intervention Unit Cobra (Austrian German: Direktion für Spezialeinheiten/Einsatzkommando Cobra, DSE). The DSE reports to the Directorate General for Public Security (GD).

The unit's missions primarily involve anti-irregular military, apprehension of armed and dangerous criminals, counterterrorism and hostage rescue crisis management, executive protection, high-risk tactical law enforcement situations, operating in difficult to access terrain, protecting high-level meeting areas, providing security in locations at risk of attack or terrorism, special reconnaissance in difficult to access and dangerous areas, support crowd control and riot control, and tactical special operations.

== History ==
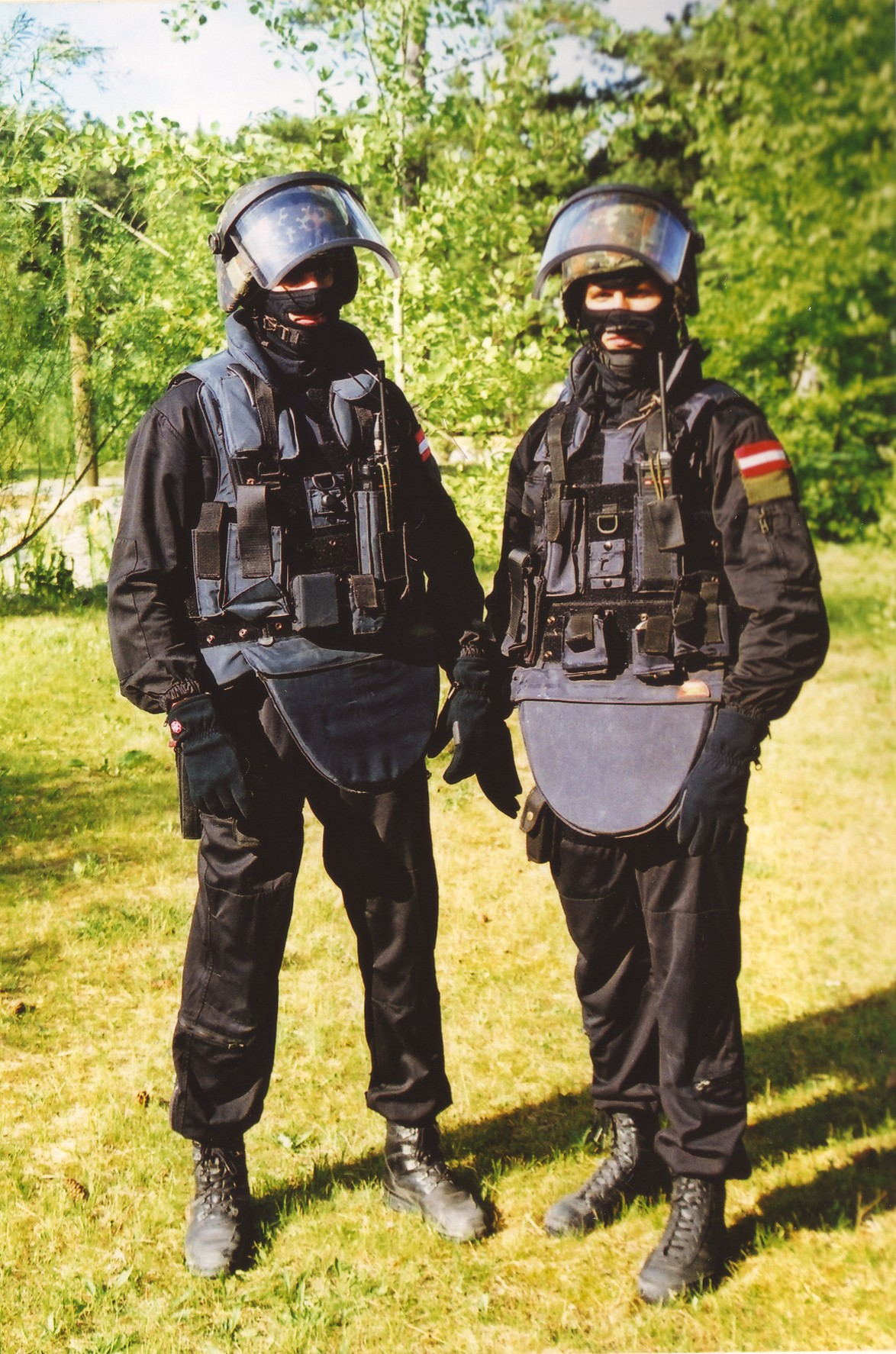
Two members of EKO Cobra in operational loadout (historic)

The roots of the EKO Cobra lie in the Gendarmerieeinsatzkommando (GEK) Bad Vöslau that was originally formed by the regional police authority of Lower Austria to protect East European Jews during their migration via Austria to Israel against terrorist threats. As the tactical skills of this unit were welcome in other fields, too, the mission of the Gendarmerieeinsatzkommando became broader in the course of years, and it climbed the hierarchy, from being a regional unit to becoming assigned directly to the Generaldirektion für öffentliche Sicherheit, the leading authority for public security within the Ministry of the Interior.

The name Cobra was coined by the press. It was a reference to the US TV series Mission: Impossible, which was aired in German under the title Kobra, übernehmen Sie. It first appeared in June 1973 in the Kronen Zeitung.

During the OPEC siege in 1975, the unit was deployed to potentially intervene, Vienna never gave the order to go ahead, and instead, agreed to pay ransom and for the terrorists involved to walk away.

The determining step of founding today's Cobra as a unit of the Ministry of the Interior rather than a regional police unit was done in 1978, primarily as a response to the Munich massacre attack on Israeli athletes at the 1972 Munich Olympics. Its main office is in Wiener Neustadt, with sub-offices in Graz, Linz, Salzburg, and Innsbruck. Germany's counter-terrorism and hostage-rescue unit GSG 9 and Isreal's Sayeret Matkal trained the first operators of the GEK.

The Federal Ministry of the Interior changed the unit's name from GEK to EKO Cobra in 2002. MEK and SEG units were also merged with the GEK.

=== Known operations ===
EKO Cobra was involved in a hostage rescue in the Graz-Karlau Prison in 1996, and numerous other operations. Although it has never participated in the same type of hostage rescue operations that the HRT, GIGN, GIS, NSG, ERU, GSG 9, and the SAS have had, the EKO Cobra is the only counter-terrorism unit to end a hijacking while the aircraft was still in the air. On 17 October 1996, four Cobra officers were on board an Aeroflot Tupolev Tu-154 escorting deported prisoners to Lagos when a Nigerian man threatened the cockpit crew with a knife and demanded a diversion to Germany or South Africa. The team overpowered the man and handed him over to authorities after landing.

In the course of the 2006 Lebanon War EKO Cobra assisted in the evacuation of Austrians and other EU citizens from Lebanon.

135 EKO Cobra operatives together with units of the Austrian Armed Forces were involved in the search for Alois Huber in the Annaberg shooting, who killed three police officers and one Red Cross EMT on 17 September 2013, in Lower Austria.

In 2016, 42 officers supported the German police in the Munich shooting.

In 2017, 20 EKO Cobra operatives were directly involved to end the severe riots in the Schanzenviertel area during the G20 Hamburg summit, three operatives were wounded.

EKO Cobra assisted in the manhunt of the remaining suspect who was involved in the 2020 Vienna attack.

EKO Cobra assisted with the arrest of suspects in the foiled 2024 Vienna terrorism plot, in which a concert by the American singer-songwriter Taylor Swift as part of The Eras Tour was targeted.

EKO Cobra would be deployed in response to the Graz school shooting on 10 June 2025.

In 2025, EKO Cobra was assigned to protect Director General of the International Atomic Energy Agency (IAEA), Rafael Grossi, following intelligence indicating a targeted threat against him from Iranian-linked individuals.

== Recruitment and training ==
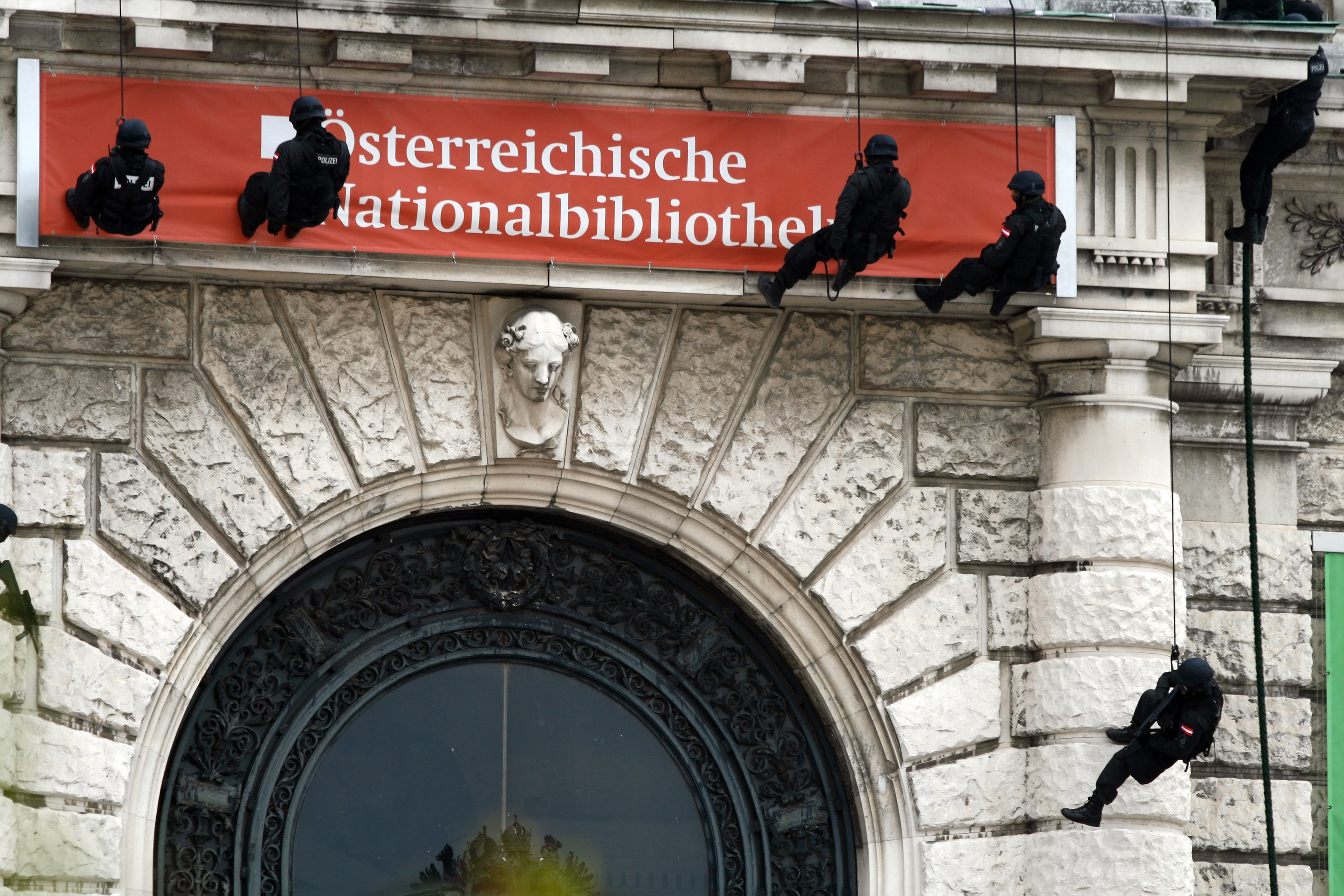
Officers of the EKO Cobra rope down a building

Any member of the Austrian Federal Police may apply to the EKO Cobra. The tests consist of medical examinations, psychological tests, and vigorous physical tests. Upon successful completion of the tests the recruits attend 6 months of specialized training which includes marksmanship, tactical training, sports, driver courses, abseiling/rappelling, hand-to-hand combat, language classes, etc. Besides the courses taught in the basic training, further specialization is possible in fields, such as parachuting, diving, explosives, or sniping.

Since its establishment in 1978, 1,140 officers have served in EKO Cobra.

== Organization ==
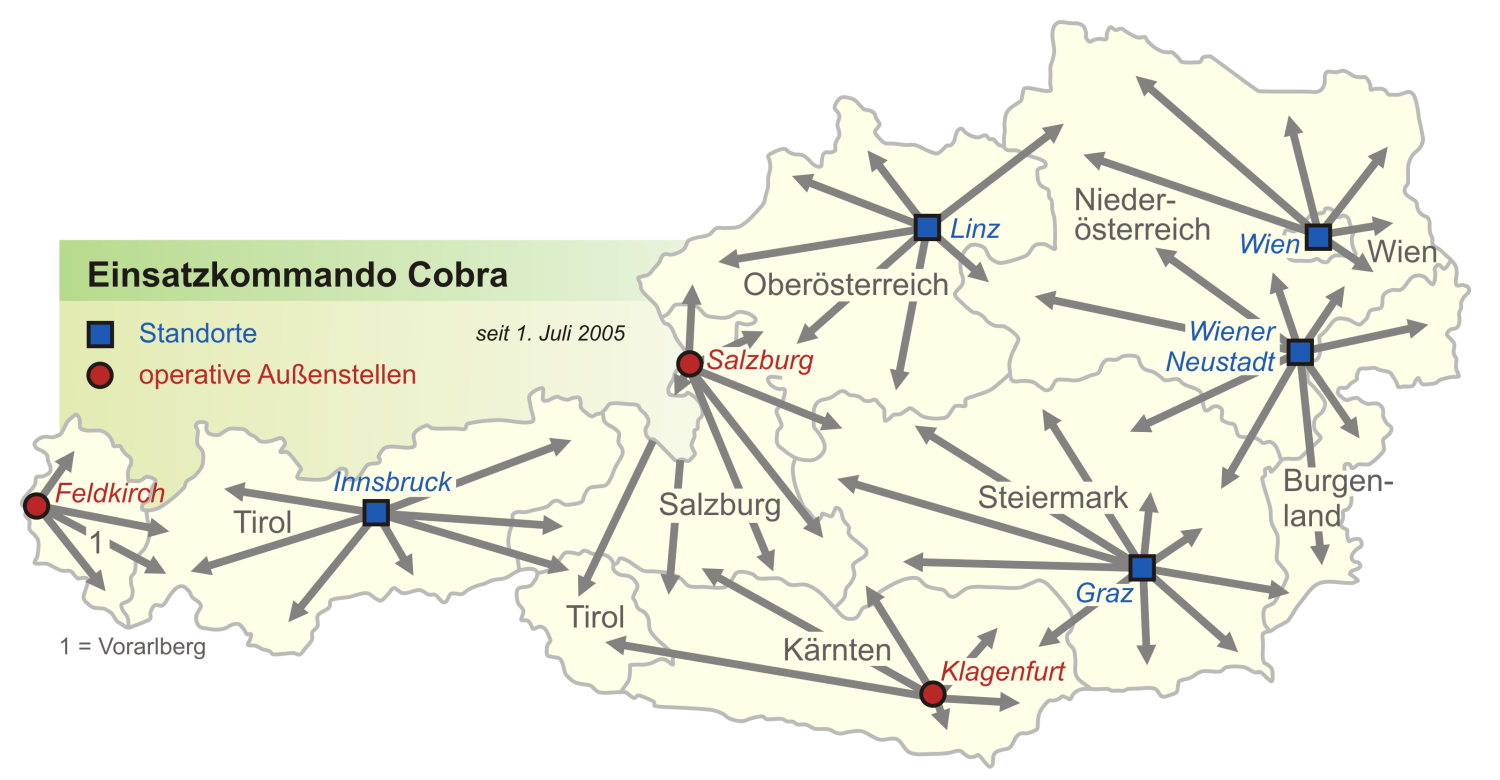
Locations of the EKO Cobra in Austria

The unit's headquarters is located in Wiener Neustadt (Lower Austria). It performs all administrative activities and the training for the EKO Cobra officers. There are departments in Vienna, Graz, Linz, and Innsbruck with small field offices in Klagenfurt, Salzburg, and Feldkirch.

Each department contains four teams and each field office contains two. This structure allows the units to be deployed anywhere in Austria in under 70 minutes.

On 1 April 2013, EKO Cobra was merged in the newly established Special Operations Directorate - DSE (Direktion für Spezialeinheiten). This organisation serves as a unified command for the units with special tasks of the Austrian Federal Police. In the meantime, the organization has been renamed to "Directorate for Special Units/Special Intervention Unit Cobra" (DSE).

Further units of the DSE are the police's bomb disposal units, the observation units and special investigative units.

When needed, the unit cooperates with operators from Wiener Einsatzgruppe Alarmabteilung (WEGA).

== Equipment ==
=== Weapons ===
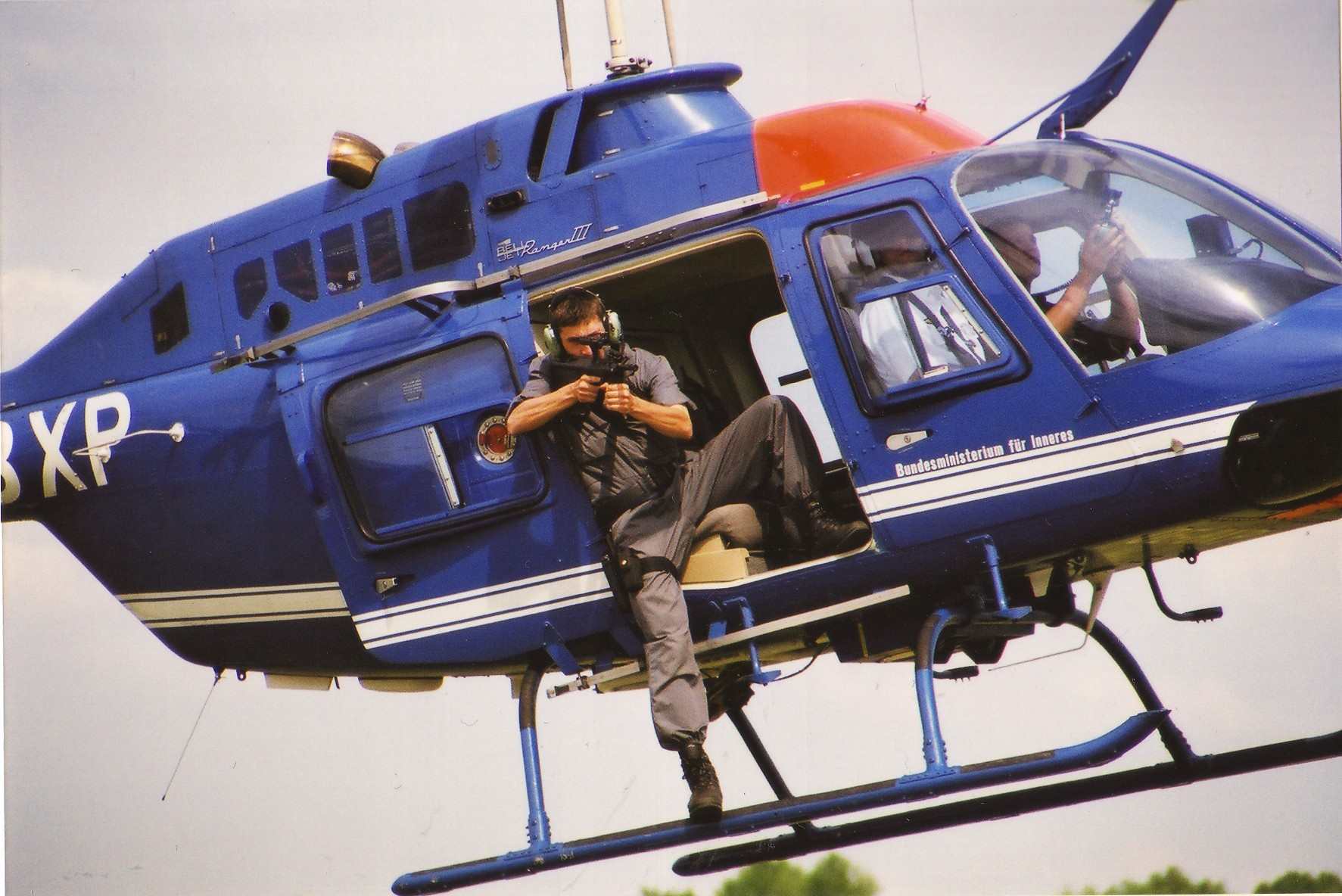
An officer of the Austrian counter-terrorism unit EKO Cobra handling a Steyr AUG rifle during an airborne operation (The aircraft is a Bell 206B Jet Ranger.)

EKO Cobra is armed mainly with Austrian weaponry, but sometimes foreign-produced arms are used too.

Name	Origin	Type	Calibre	Notes
Assault Rifle & Battle Rifle
Steyr AUG	Austria	Assault Rifle	5.56×45mm	A1, A2, and A3 variants used.
Pistol
Glock 17 Gen 3	Austria	Semi-automatic pistol	9×19mm	Standard issue sidearm, sometimes equipped with a tactical flashlight.
Glock 18	Austria	Machine pistol	9×19mm	Select-fire capability (semi-automatic, fully automatic)
Glock 19	Austria	Semi-automatic pistol	9×19mm	
Manurhin MR 73	France	Revolver		Former sidearm, now replaced.
Submachine Gun
UZI	Israel	Submachine Gun	9x19mm	Replaced by the HK MP5SD3
Steyr TMP	Austria	Submachine Gun	9x19mm	
Heckler & Koch MP5	Germany	Submachine Gun	9x19mm	Primarily used the SD3 variant; replaced by the B&T APC9.
B&T APC9	Switzerland	Submachine Gun	9x19mm	
Heckler & Koch MP7	Germany	Personal defense weapon	4.6×30mm	Small number used for close protection ops; replaced by the B&T APC9.
Sniper rifle
Steyr SSG 69	Austria	Sniper rifle	7.62×51mm	Including sound-suppressed variant
PGM Hécate II	France	Anti-materiel rifle	.50 BMG	
Shotgun
Remington 870	United States	Pump-action shotgun	12 gauge	
Franchi SPAS-12	Italy	Combat shotgun	12 gauge	
H&K HK512	Germany	Semi-automatic shotgun	12 gauge	
Grenade launcher
H&K HK69A1	Germany	Grenade launcher	40mm	

=== Special equipment ===
EKO Cobra use a variety of equipment designed for a variety of situations.

- Protective gear made of kevlar or ceramic
- Balaclavas
- Camouflage suits
- Tonfa batons
- OC sprays

=== Uniforms ===
EKO Cobra officers wear the uniform of the Austrian Federal Police with certain modifications:

- Maroon beret to indicate their elite status
- The unit's insignia is worn instead of the police insignia
- The rank insignia's background is black instead of red as from the regular Federal Police uniforms

During tactical operations the officers wear green or black coveralls along with their tactical gear.

== Annual Warrior Competition ==
EKO Cobra competed in the 2011 Annual Warrior Competition winning top honors. EKO Cobra defeated a United States Marine Corps 13th MEU and a joint team from U.S. Army Special Forces 5th Group and Jordan SFG 101 among many others.

== Ranks ==
These are the former ranks of EKO Cobra, before the current standard rank insignia were adopted in 2015.

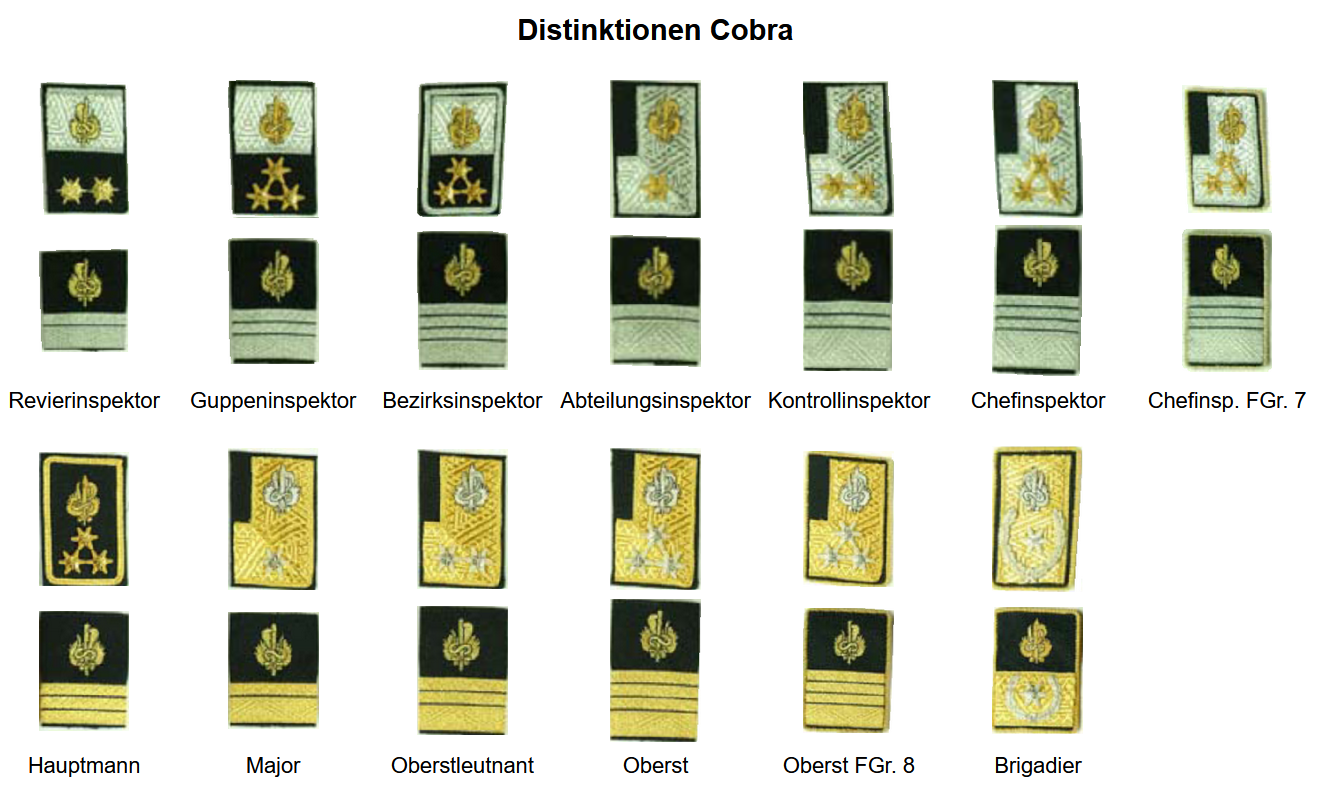
Ranks of EKO Cobra

== Bibliography ==
- Neville, Rolf (2017). European Counter-Terrorist Units: 1972–2017. Osprey Publishing. ISBN 978-1472825292.
- Neville, Leigh (2019). The Elite: The A–Z of Modern Special Operations Forces. Oxford: Osprey Publishing. ISBN 978-1472824295.
