= Directorate General for Public Security =

Agency overview
- Formed: September 23, 1930

Jurisdictional structure
- Operations jurisdiction: Austria
- Constituting instrument: Security Policing Act

Operational structure
- Overseen by: Franz Ruf, Director General
- Headquarters: Palais Modena, Innere Stadt, Vienna
- Agency executives: Omar Haijawi-Pirchner, Director of the DSN; GEN Andreas Holzer, Director of the BK; Bernhard Treibenreif, Director of the DSE; Reinhard Schnakl, Director of the ORK; GEN Michael Takács, Director of the BPD
- Parent agency: Ministry of the Interior
- Child agencies: Directorate State Protection and Intelligence Service; Criminal Intelligence Service Austria; Directorate for Special Units/Special Intervention Unit Cobra; Directorate Organisation, Resources and Crisis Management GD; Federal Police

Website
- www.bmi.gv.at

The Directorate General for Public Security (Generaldirektion für die öffentliche Sicherheit, "GD" or "GDföS") is the governing body of general law enforcement in Austria and a division of the Ministry of the Interior. The Directorate General is headquartered in the Palais Modena, Vienna.

== History ==
The Directorate General was first established in 1930 as a division of the Chancellery. After the annexation of Austria by Nazi Germany in 1938, Heinrich Himmler ordered the organization's dissolution. The Directorate General was restored following the end of Nazi rule, but did not gain back control of most police forces until the Transition of Authorities Act 1945, when the authorities, offices and other institutions of the German Reich in Austria were dissolved and the Austrian authorities re-established.

On March 31, 2019, Director General Michaela Kardeis resigned from her position. Reinhard Schnakl took over the position on an interim basis after the actual deputy Franz Lang (former Director of the Criminal Intelligence Service Austria) went on a sick leave.

During the Ibiza affair scandal of May 2019, Interior Minister Herbert Kickl moved to appoint Peter Goldgruber, with whom he had close ties, Director General on 20 May. The affair marked the likely collapse of the Cabinet and as the Director General is a career civil servant position that transcends political leadership changes, appointing Goldgruber would have allowed Kickl and his party to retain control over law enforcement while no longer being in power themselves. However, Goldgruber's appointment required presidential confirmation (otherwise he would only hold the position's powers and duties but not the position itself) but President Van der Bellen declined to approve the appointment. On 22 May, Van der Bellen removed Kickl from office on the request of Chancellor Sebastian Kurz and Kickl's successor Eckart Ratz dismissed Goldgruber a few days later.

On July 1, 2020, Franz Ruf was inaugurated as the new Director General. He still holds this office today (June 2025).

== Directorates ==
=== Federal Police Directorate ===
The Federal Police is the primary civilian law enforcement agency of Austria, responsible for ordinary policing and border control. It succeeded the Gendarmerie, the Guard Corps, the Detective Corps, and the urban police forces in 2005.

In November 2021, the Federal Ministry of the Interior announced that, as part of a major reform of the central office of the Ministry of the Interior, a further group is to be set up in the Directorate General for Public Security called the Federal Police Directorate (Austrian German: Bundespolizeidirektion, BPD). However, this is not planned as a new management level above the provincial police directorates, but as a contact point for them. Due to the reform, the Federal Police has been a separate organizational unit since Juli 2022.

The Federal Police is organised into nine police directorates, one for each state, and a dozen autonomous police units. Police commands serve as the elementary divisions of the Federal Police and operate on municipality or precinct level; they either report to one of the nine police directorates or to a precinct authority. The police commands of Vienna, the state capitals, and the other major urban centers are subject to the operational direction of the police directorates, while most rural area police commands serve under precinct authorities. The police directorates are headed by commissioners who report directly to the minister of the interior.

=== Directorate for Special Units/Special Intervention Unit Cobra ===
Several organizational units belong to the Directorate for Special Units/Special Intervention Unit Cobra (Austrian German: Direktion für Spezialeinheiten/Einsatzkommando Cobra, DSE):

- EKO Cobra (Special Intervention Unit Cobra): Main police tactical unit of Austria responsible for hostage situations, highly dangerous criminal apprehensions, organized crime, counterterrorism, the protection of high-profile politicians, and providing air marshals for commercial flights.
- OBS (Central Observation): Deployed in terrorist situations, organized crime, serious crime, drug trafficking and drug smuggling.
- ESD (IEDD Unit): Detection and defusing of objects suspected of containing explosives.
- Airborne Police (Flugpolizei): Conducts airborne operations to support the Federal Police with criminal matters, major events, and traffic control. It also assists fire fighters when needed and carries out search and rescue missions for the Oberste Zivilluftfahrtbehörde (Supreme Civil Aviation Authority), Austria’s National Aviation Authority. The Airborne Police is also in close cooperation with the European border agency Frontex.
- CBRN-CC (CBRN-Competence-Center): Responsible for all matters relating to chemical, biological, radiological and nuclear hazards.

=== Directorate State Protection and Intelligence Service ===
The Directorate State Protection and Intelligence Service (Austrian German: Direktion Staatsschutz und Nachrichtendienst, DSN) is the primary civilian security agency of Austria. It is divided into the areas of threat research and threat prevention.

The responsibilities are the protection of:

- constitutional institutions and their ability to act as well as representatives of foreign states, international organizations and other subjects of international law in accordance with obligations under international law,
- critical infrastructure, and
- the population against terrorist, ideologically or religiously motivated crime, against threats from espionage, intelligence activities and proliferation.

=== Criminal Intelligence Service Austria ===
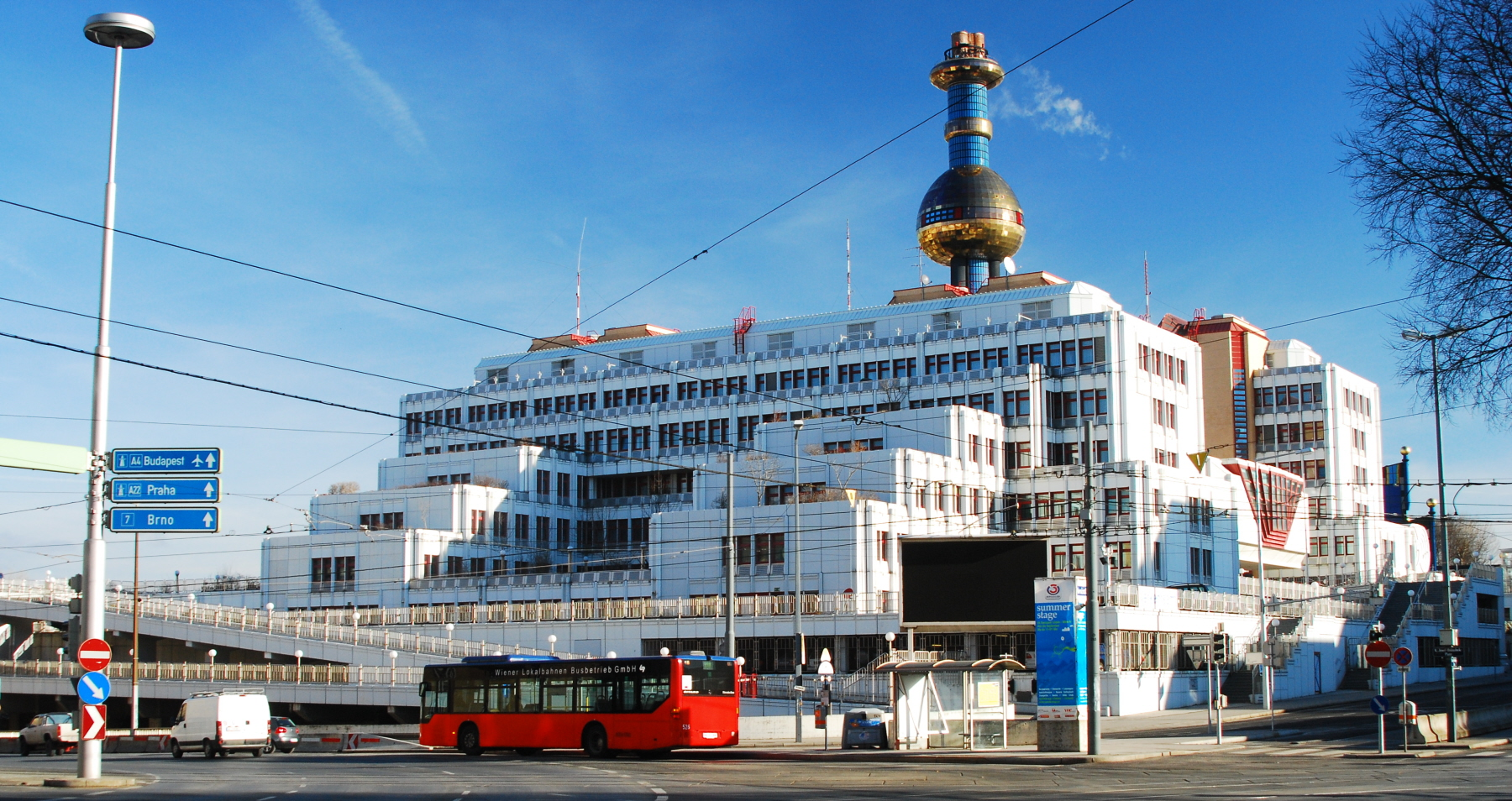
Headquarter of the Bundeskriminalamt in Vienna

The Criminal Intelligence Service Austria (Austrian German: Bundeskriminalamt, BK) is a specialized police agency that investigates organized crime, violent crime and offences against sexual integrity, drug-related crime, human trafficking and white-collar crime.

All official communication with foreign police and judicial authorities is handled by the Criminal Intelligence Service Austria. The Interpol national central office, the Europol national office and the liaison officer office in The Hague are therefore also located there.

It is also responsible for crime prevention, criminal analysis, research and forensics.

=== Directorate Organisation, Resources and Crisis Management GD ===
The Directorate Organisation, Resources and Crisis Management GD (Austrian German: Direktion Organisation, Ressourcen- und Krisenmanagement GD, ORK) is responsible for personnel management, material resource management, budget management and controlling for the entire Directorate General.

It is also responsible for crisis resilience, disaster Relief and civil protection.
