= Palais Modena =

Palace in Vienna, Austria

Coordinates: 48.209°N 16.366°E

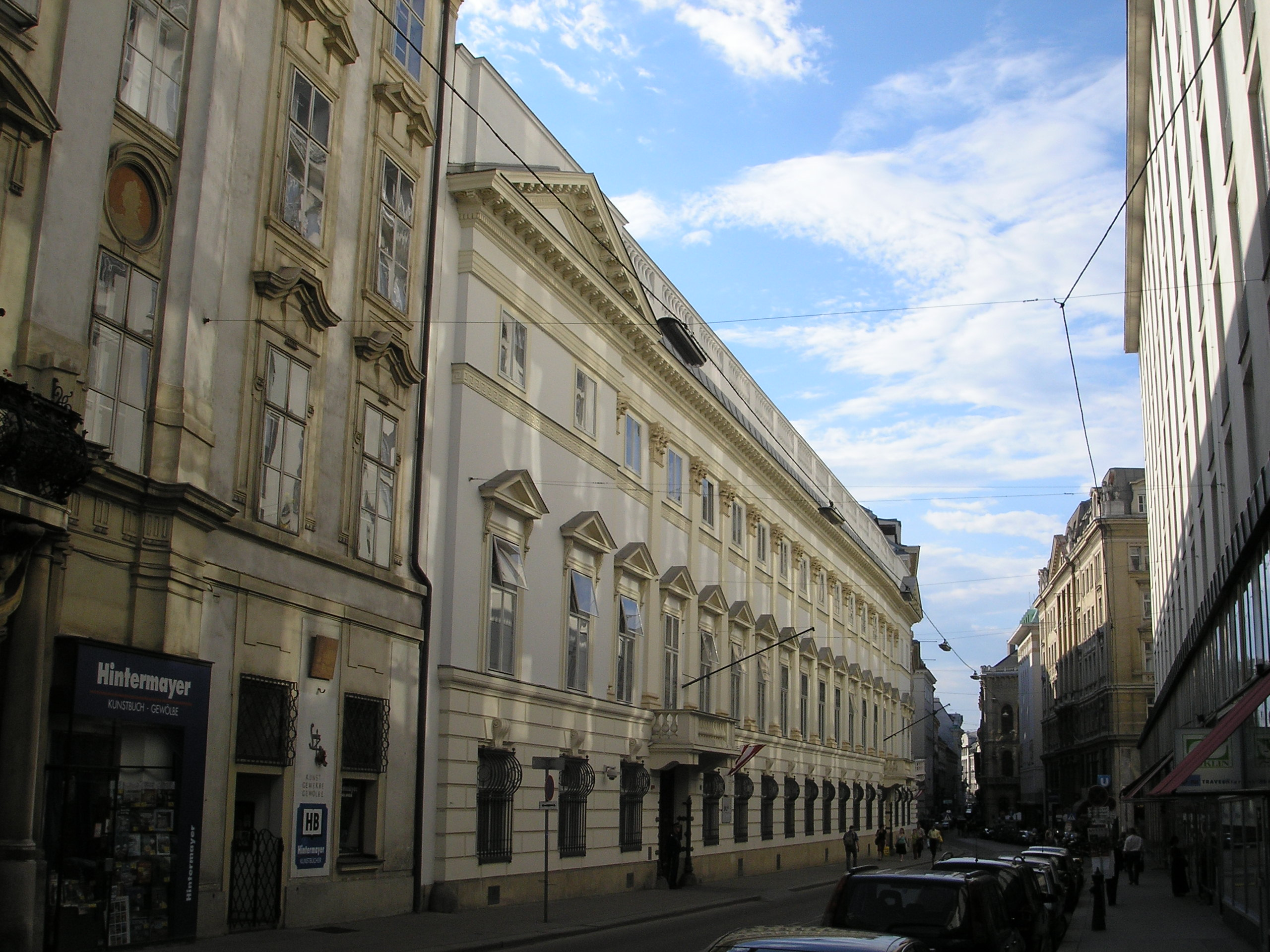
Palais Modena in Vienna

Palais Modena is a palace in Vienna, Austria. It was built and owned by the Habsburgs of the Austria-Este branch of the family.

Today it houses offices of the Federal Ministry of the Interior.
