= Ministry of the Interior (Austria) =

Government ministry of Austria

Federal Ministry of the Interior
- Bundesministerium für Inneres

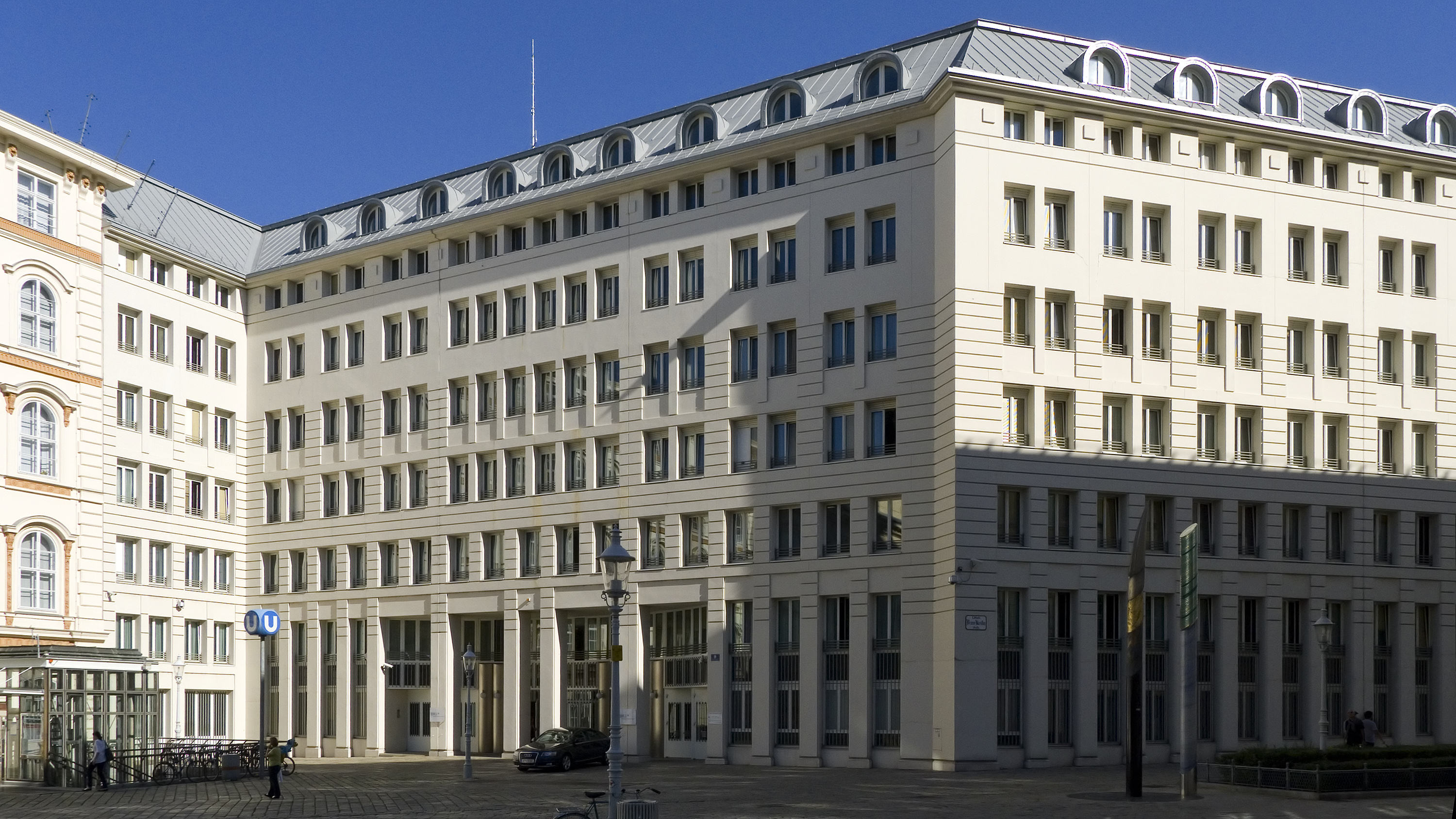

Agency overview
- Formed: 1848; 177 years ago as Imperial and Royal Ministry of the Interior
- Preceding agency: Imperial and Royal Ministry of the Interior (1848)
- Jurisdiction: Government of Austria
- Status: Highest federal authority
- Headquarters: Palais Modena; Innere Stadt, Vienna; 48°12′33″N 16°21′57″E
- Annual budget: €4.850 billion (2025)
- Minister responsible: Gerhard Karner
- Child agencies: Directorate General for the Public Security; Federal Police; Federal Criminal Police Office; DSN; EKO Cobra
- Website: www.bmi.gv.at

In Austria, the Ministry of the Interior (German: Bundesministerium für Inneres, colloquially Innenministerium, abbreviated: BMI) is a federal government agency serving as the interior ministry of the Austrian government. It is chiefly responsible for the public security, but also deals with matters relating to citizenship, elections, referendums, plebiscites and the alternative civilian service. The Ministry of the Interior is considered one of the most important ministries in Austria.

It operates and oversees the vast majority of the country's law enforcement agencies, including the Federal Police Directorate (BPD), the Criminal Intelligence Service Austria (BK), the Directorate State Protection and Intelligence Service (DSN), the Federal Bureau of Anti-Corruption (BAK), the Directorate for Special Units/Special Intervention Unit Cobra (DSE), and the Special Observatory Unit for Surveillance (SEO). The Directorate General for the Public Security (GD), which is primarily made up of career law enforcement officers, serves as the professional governing body of all these agencies, except for the BAK. Federal law enforcement agencies outside of the ministry's control include the Military Police, the Fiscal Police, and the Judiciary Guard.

The Palais Modena is the ministry's central headquarters, it is situated in the centre of Austria's capital Vienna.

== History ==
The Ministry was originally created as "Imperial and Royal Ministry of the Interior", serving as the empire-wide interior ministry for Austria-Hungary. It was succeeded by the "state office of the Interior" (Staatsamt des Innern) of the First Republic in 1918, and later renamed into "Federal Ministry of the Interior". After the dissolution of Nazi Germany in 1945 the Ministry was reestablished into its current form.

Until 1848 internal affairs of the country was under the responsibility of the Austro-Bohemian Court Chancellery which was established by Empress Maria Theresia. In 1848 the ministry was established with the name of the Ministry of the Interior. Between 1918 and 1920 it was called State Office of the Interior. Then it was merged with the ministry of education and was renamed as State Office and Federal Ministry of the Interior and of Education. The body was integrated into the federal government in 1923. Following World War II it was renamed into its current title, Federal Ministry of the Interior.

== Responsibilities ==
The federal agency is charged with the matters of public security, citizenship and civil status including legal names, elections, referendums and popular petitions as well as emergency management and the alternative civilian service.

As superior of the Directorate General for Public Security, the Minister for the Interior is in charge of the Federal Police, the Directorate State Protection and Intelligence Service, the EKO Cobra tactical unit as well as of the Federal Criminal Police Office. Beyond the jurisdiction of the Federal Chancellery, the Ministry is also responsible for the matters of the Austrian states and municipalities, foundations and sovereign wealth funds.

== Organization ==
The ministry consists of the Minister of the Interior, the State Secretary and the Secretary General, under whom there are five sections:

1. Central Administration
2. Directorate General for the Public Security
3. Law
4. Cybersecurity, Digital Matters and Service
5. Migration and International Matters

Its head and chief executive authority is the Minister of the Interior (Bundesminister), currently Gerhard Karner. Next in rank is the State Secretary (Staatssekretär) responsible for the Directorate State Protection and Intelligence Service (DSN), currently Jörg Leichtfried. The Secretary General (Generalsekretär), currently Andreas Achatz, serves as the agency's head of operations and third-highest-ranking official.

== See also ==
- List of Austrian Ministers of the Interior
- List of Austrian Ministers of Foreign Affairs
- Directorate General for the Public Security
- Federal Police
- Federal Criminal Office
- History of Austria
- Minister of Defense (Austria)
- Ministry of Finance (Austria)
- Ministry of Foreign Affairs (Austria)
- Politics of Austria
- Chancellor of Austria
- President of Austria
