= Federal Police (Austria) =

Austrian police force

Federal Police Bundespolizei

Agency overview
- Formed: 1 July 2005
- Preceding agency: Gendarmerie (1849–2005)
- Employees: 30,900

Jurisdictional structure
- Operations jurisdiction: Austria
- Governing body: Directorate General for Public Security
- General nature: Civilian police

Facilities
- Stations: 1000+

Website
- bmi.gv.at

The Federal Police (Austrian German: Bundespolizei, pronounced [ˈbʊndəspoliˌtsaɪ]) is the national and principal law enforcement agency of Austria. It is responsible for general policing, criminal investigation support, public order duties, traffic policing, emergency response and a range of specialised police services throughout the country. The Federal Police also serves as Austria’s border control agency.

The force is administered by the Federal Ministry of the Interior through the Directorate General for Public Security, and provides police services through nine provincial police directorates, one for each Austrian state. Its duties are carried out by uniformed patrol officers, criminal police units, traffic police, border police, dog units, riot and rapid-response formations, and other specialised sections.

Criminal policing at national level is supported by the Criminal Intelligence Service Austria (German: Bundeskriminalamt), which acts as a central police authority for serious and organised crime, international police cooperation, forensics, crime analysis and the exchange of information with foreign law-enforcement partners.

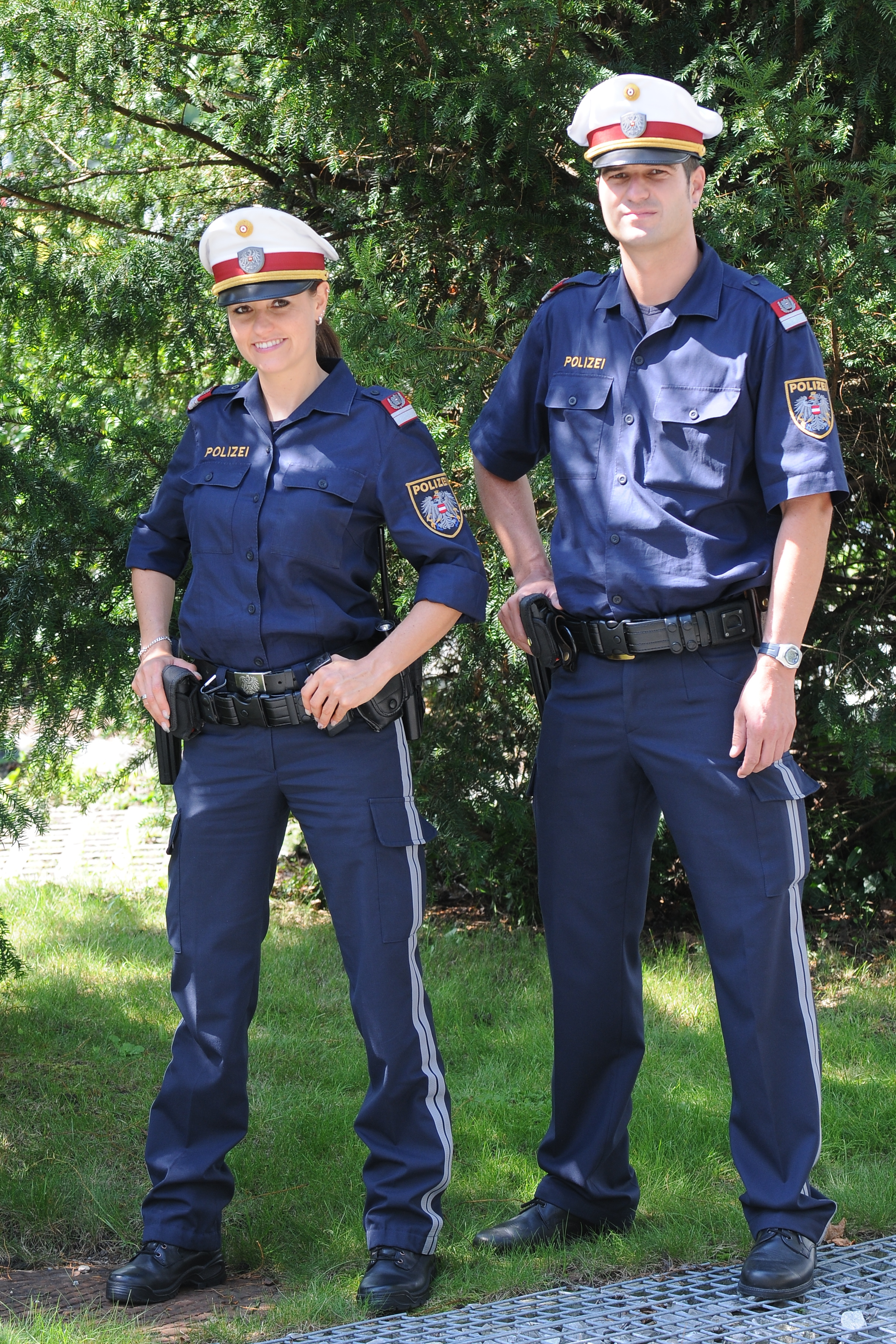
Federal Police officers

== History ==
In 2005, the Federal Police replaced the Austrian Federal Gendarmerie, which policed most of the country, and the Polizei, which policed Austria’s major urban centres such as Vienna, Salzburg and Graz.

In October 2021, the FP unveiled the Schnelle Interventionsgruppe (SIG) or the Rapid Intervention Group as a response to concerns that police response to serious incidents cannot be mobilized on time. The SIG is deployed in various cities in Austria. The SIG is under the Schnellen Reaktionskräfte (SRK) or Rapid Reaction Force with the Bereitschaftseinheit (BE) or the Standby Unit.

== Training ==
Basic police training is as diverse and challenging as the profession itself. It is practice-oriented, with the best possible integration of the various training content. The goals are confidence in action and community engagement based on human rights principles. On the first day of basic training, you will be assigned to a class and meet your fellow trainees and instructors. First, the formalities will be taken care of, and then the individual lessons will begin. The uniform will be issued relatively quickly, as it must be worn during lessons. You should also be able to identify with it.

The training is very exciting; you'll learn about various legal subjects, such as criminal law, traffic law, communication, physical education, operational training, and much more, thereby also achieving a balance for both body and mind. You'll receive a thorough two-year training program and a monthly stipend.

The two-year basic police training, which is divided into a twelve-month basic training, a three-month professional internship I, a five-month advanced training with subsequent service examination and a final four-month professional internship II, covers all essential content necessary for practicing the police profession.

Classes take place Monday to Friday from 7:30 a.m. to 3:30 p.m. Depending on your progress, you may also be called upon to perform additional duties as part of your basic training.

The content learned in basic training can be summarized in the following areas: personal and socio-communicative skills, police-related skills, situationally appropriate action skills, perception and reflection skills, and the professional internship.

Basic training – twelve months During the first twelve months you will receive basic legal, operational tactical and technical knowledge that you need for service in a police station. Vocational Internship I – Three Months For three months, you will become familiar with the daily operations of a police station. This internship serves to impart operational knowledge and to assess your personal and professional suitability for police service. Advanced Training – five months followed by the final examination. Back at school, you will reflect on the training content, experiences, and insights gained during your internship. Further in-depth study will then take place to prepare you for your second professional internship. The final examination follows. After the final examination, the second professional internship begins. Vocational internship II – four months Here you will be continuously prepared for your future work.

== Requirements ==
- Austrian citizenship
- Full capacity to act
- Personal and professional suitability
- Impeccable reputation
- Minimum age 18 years for admission to the basic training course
- For male applicants, full completion of military or civilian service is also required, or in exceptional cases, a certificate of unfitness for service upon admission to the basic training course.
- Driving licence class B without restrictions except for the restriction of "wearing a visual aid" upon entry into basic training

== Command structure ==
The Federal Police is commanded by the Austrian Federal Ministry of the Interior. The Federal Minister of the Interior is the highest law enforcement authority.

The Federal Police works in partnership with the 19 municipal police agencies and other law enforcement agencies in Austria.

The Provincial Police Directorates - established as federal authorities in the provinces - are subordinate to the Federal Minister. District administrative authorities (i.e. authorities established in the provinces for indirect federal administration) are subordinate to the Provincial Police Directorates.

There are nine separate provincial police directorates which correspond to the nine provinces of Austria:

- Vienna
- Styria
- Carinthia
- Salzburg
- Lower Austria
- Upper Austria
- Vorarlberg
- Tyrol
- Burgenland
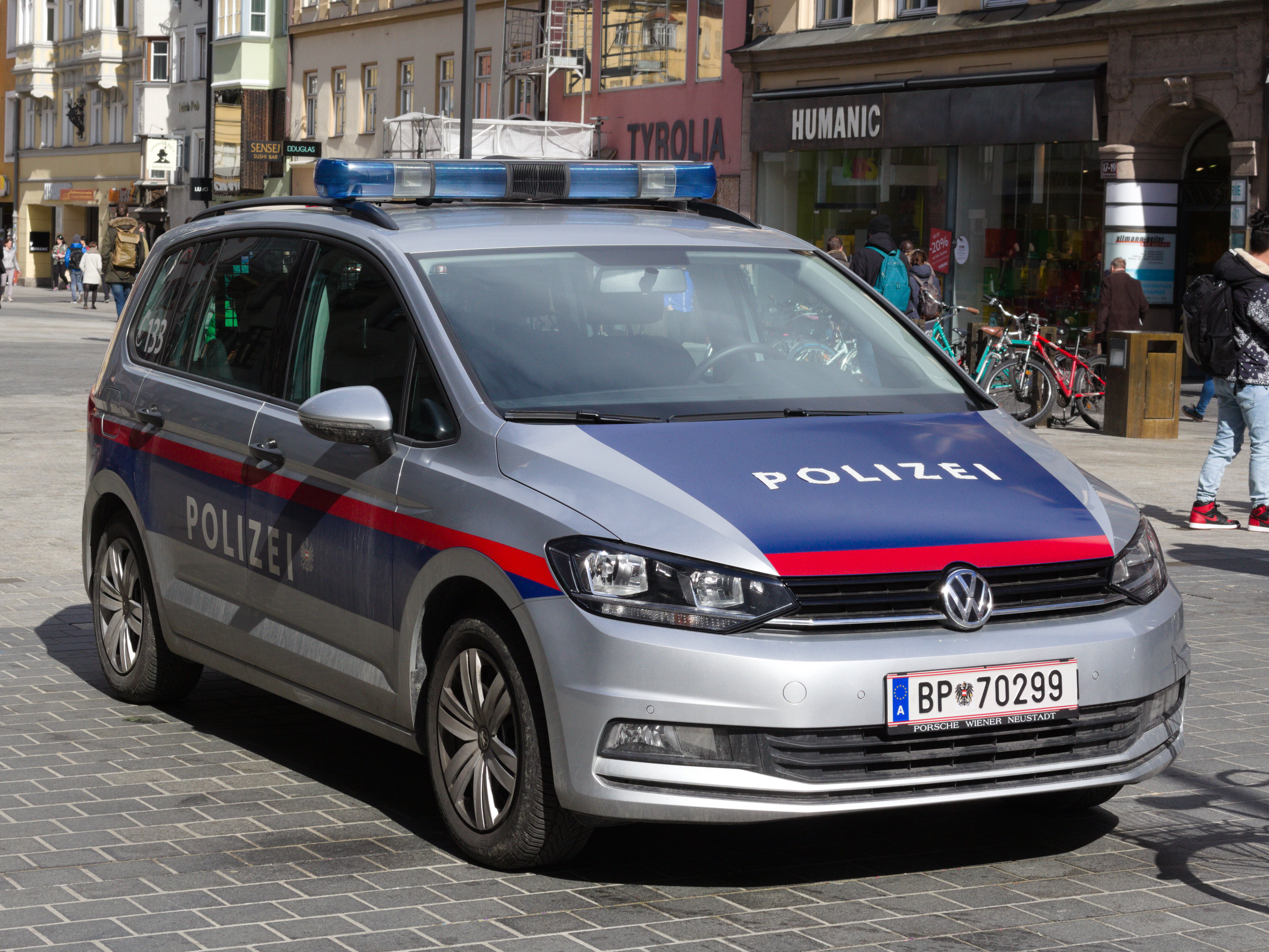
  Federal Police Volkswagen Touran

Dependent on the division, the districts and cities are controlled by either a District Police Command or a City Police Command. These commands then operate through several police stations throughout the state.

== Equipment ==
Weapon	Origin	Type	Notes
Glock 17	Austria	Semi-automatic pistol	Standard issue sidearm
Glock 19	Austria	Semi-automatic pistol	Standard issue sidearm
Glock 18	Austria	Semi-automatic pistol	Reserved for EKO Cobra
Heckler & Koch MP5	Germany	Submachine gun	
Steyr AUG	Austria	Assault rifle	

Officers are also equipped with batons and pepper spray for use as a less lethal option.

== Ranks and rank insignia ==
Commissioners

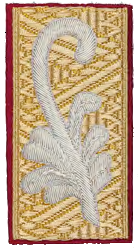
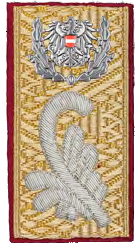
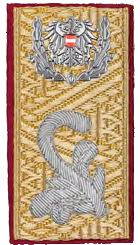
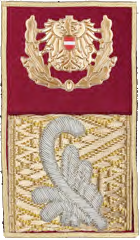
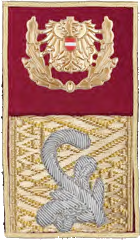
(Austria) Austrian Federal Police
(Austria) Austrian Federal Police	Generaldirektor für die öffentliche Sicherheit	Landespolizei- Direktor	Landespolizei- Direktor-Stellvertreter	Abteilungsleiter Landespolizei- direktion	Stadthauptmann
(Austria) Austrian Federal Police	Commissioner general of public security	State commissioner	Deputy state commissioner	Assistant state commissioner	City police commissioner

Leading officers

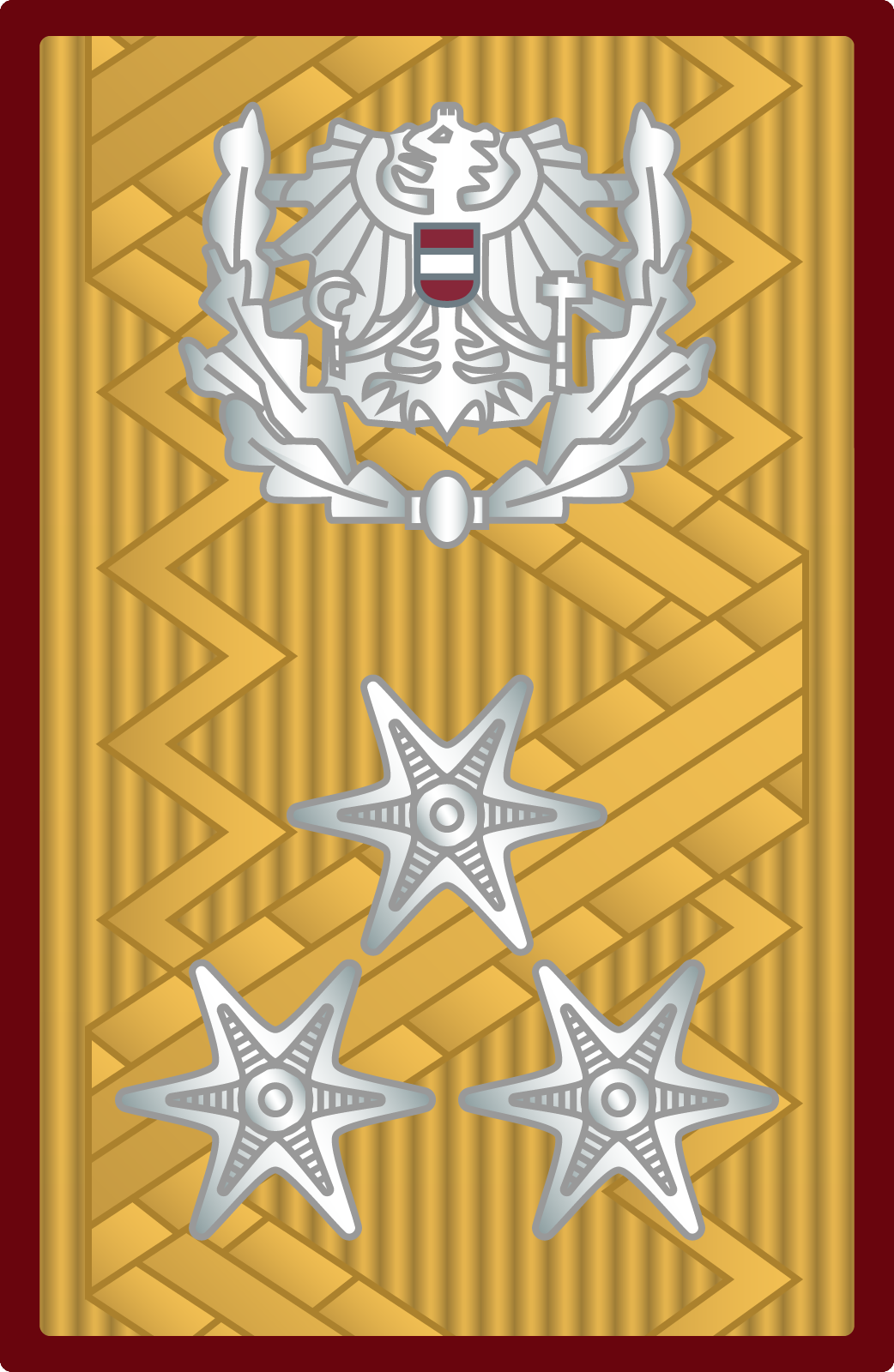
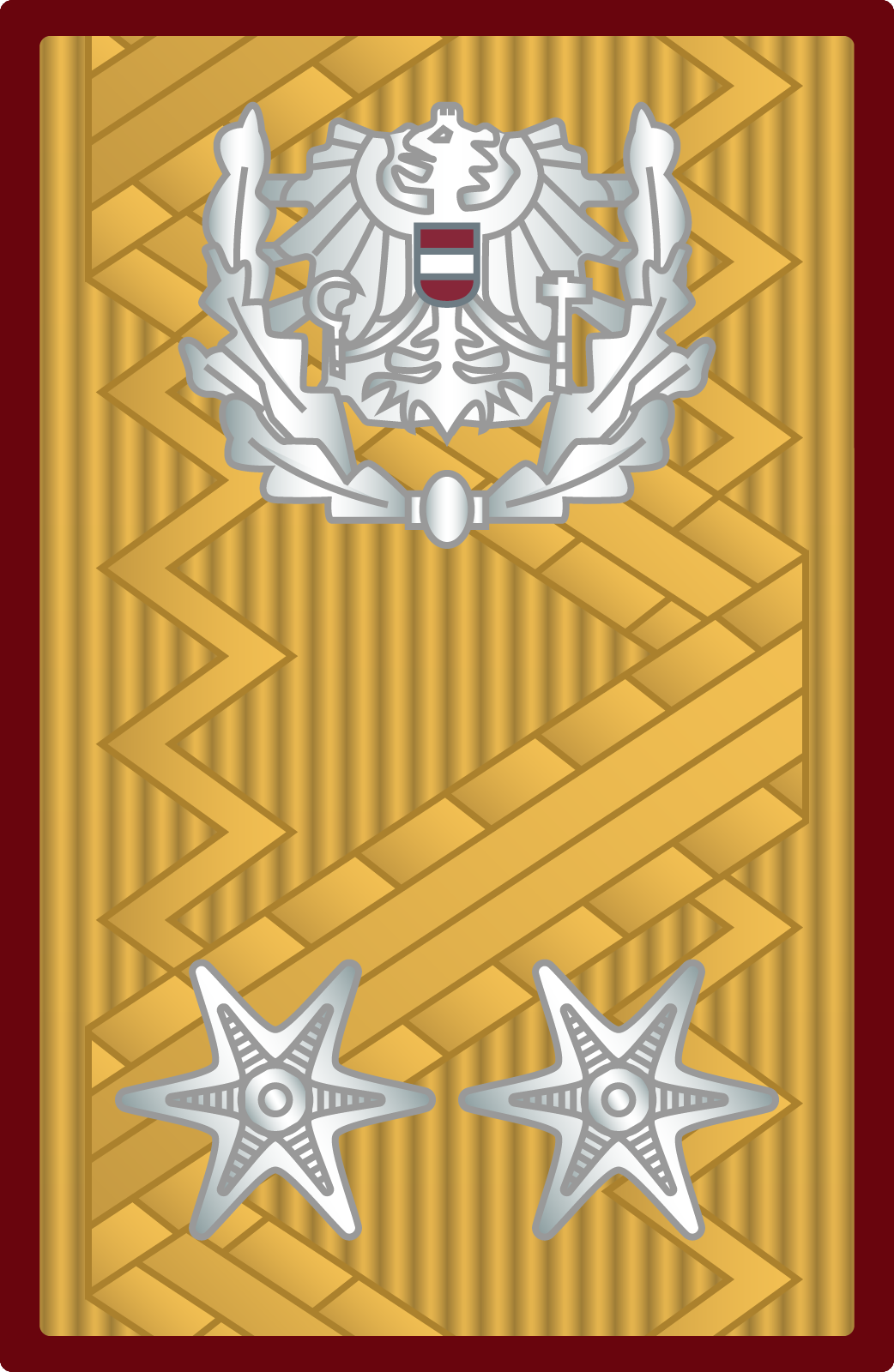
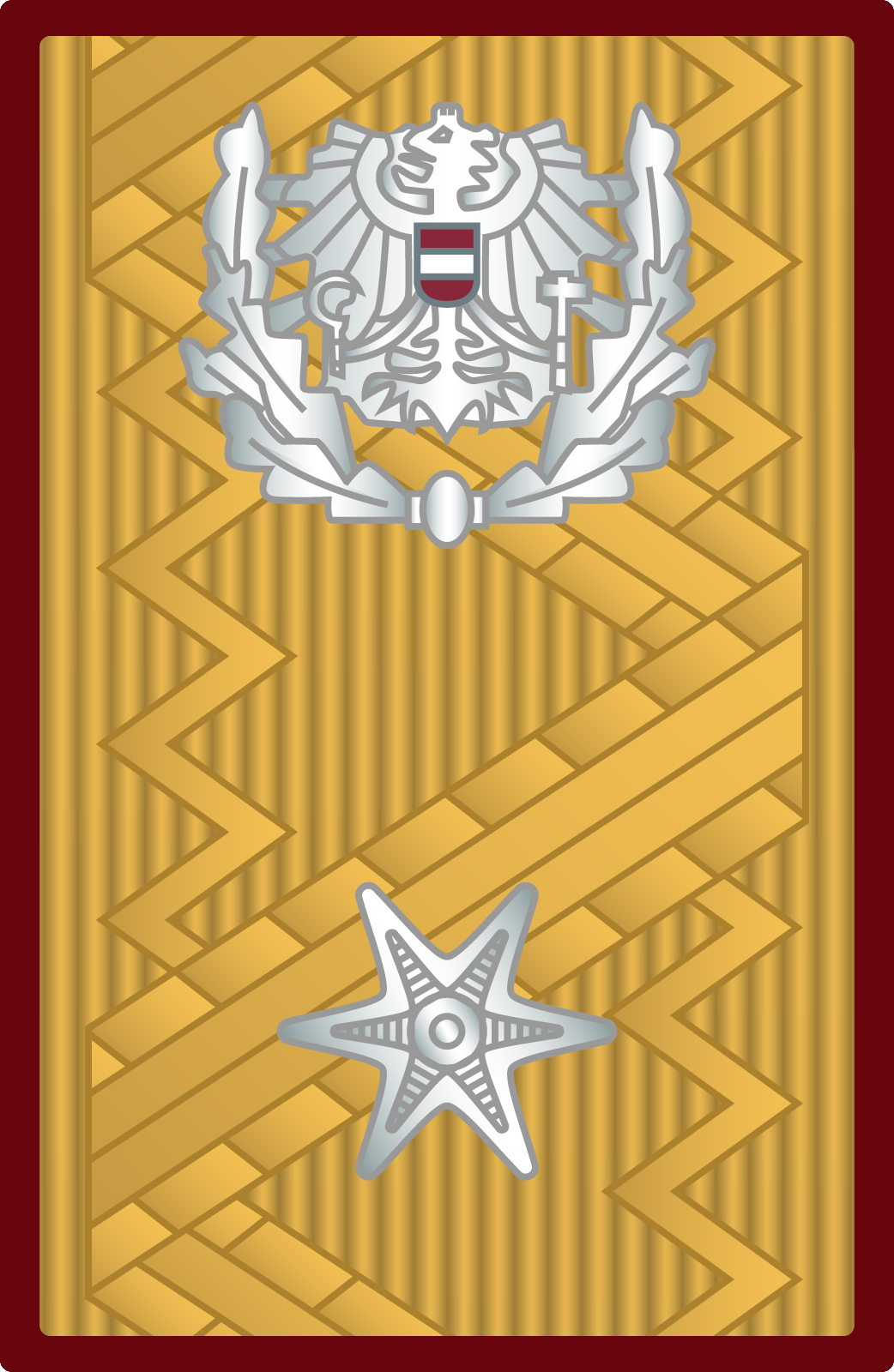
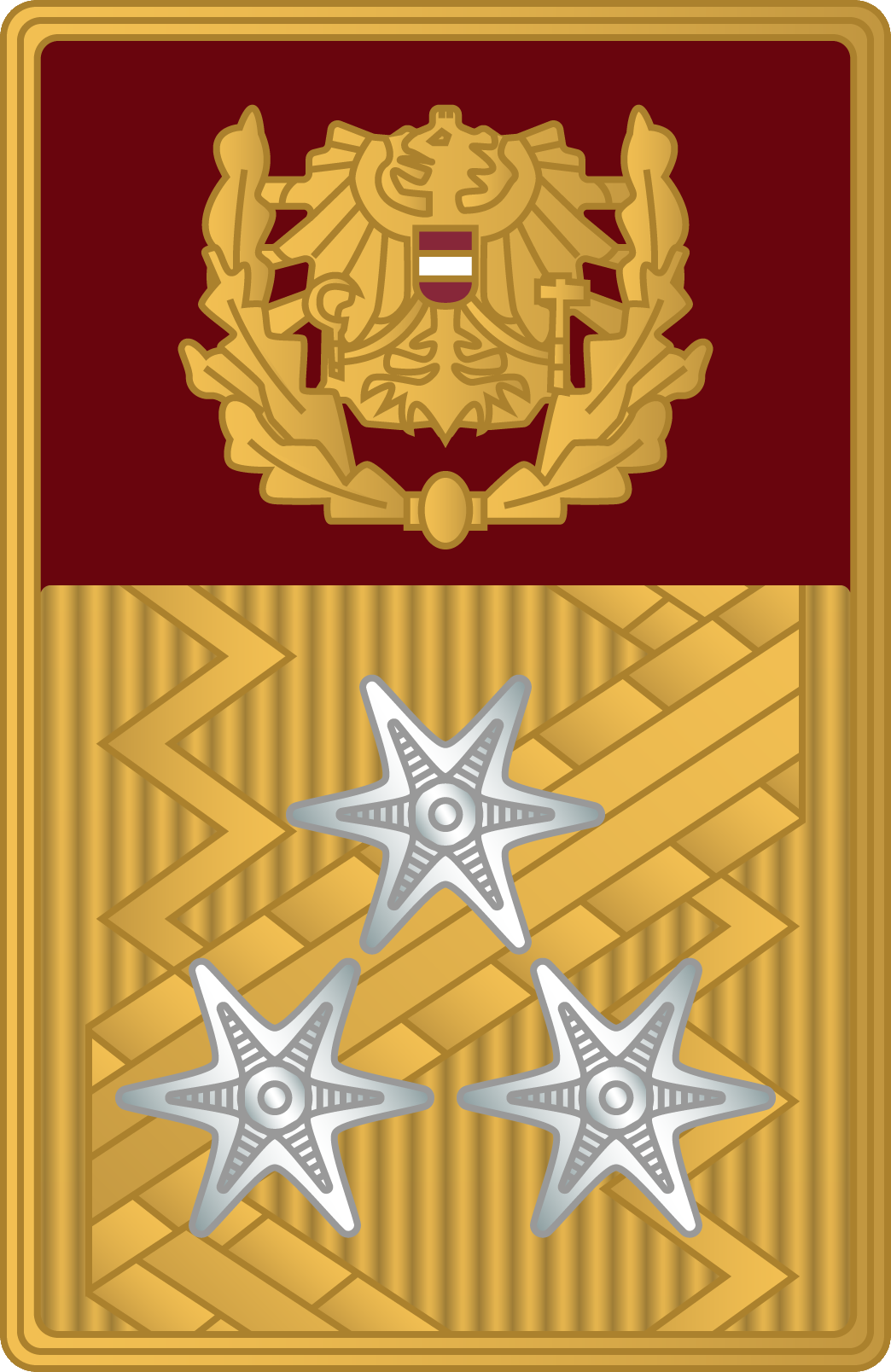
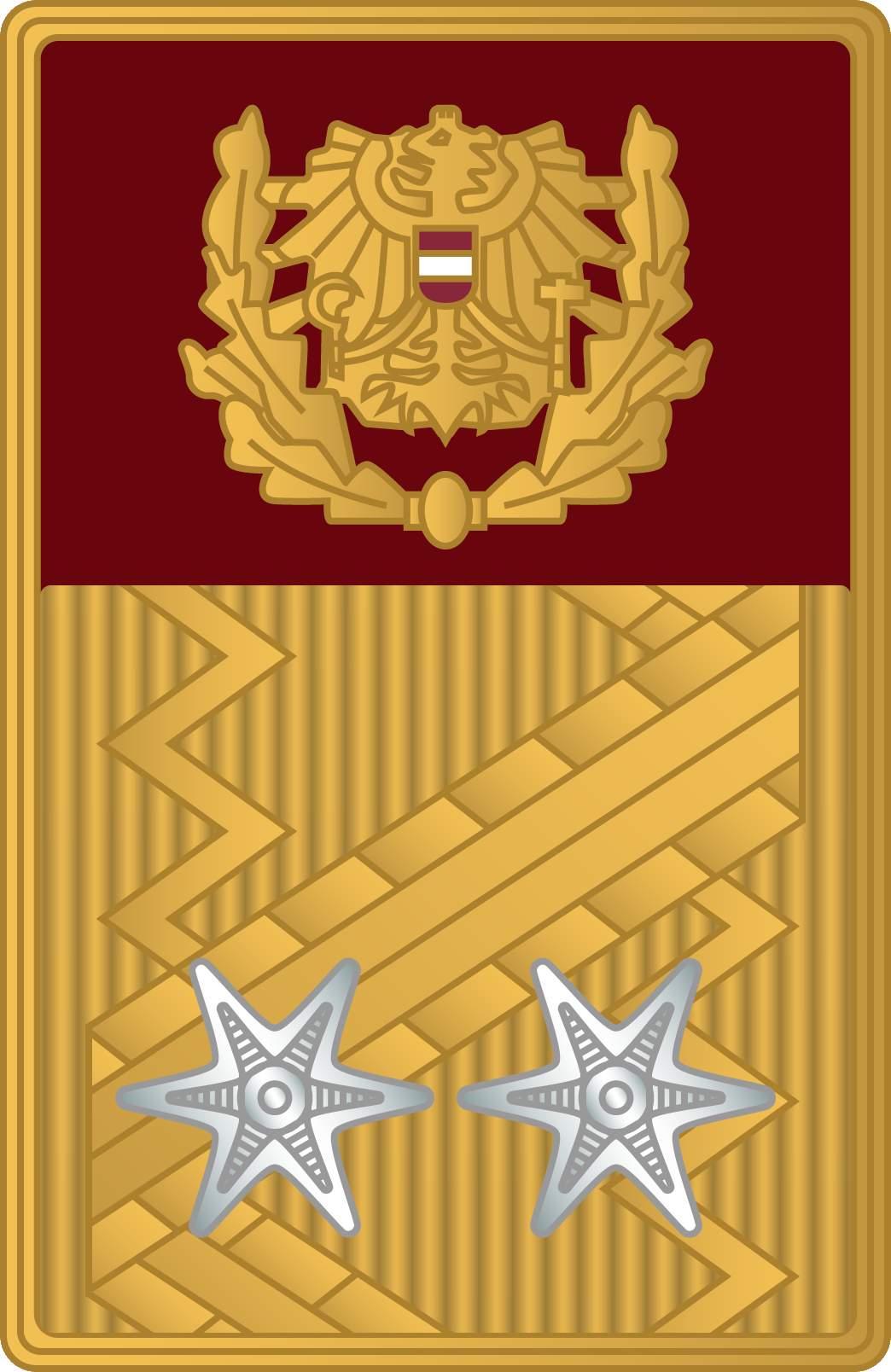
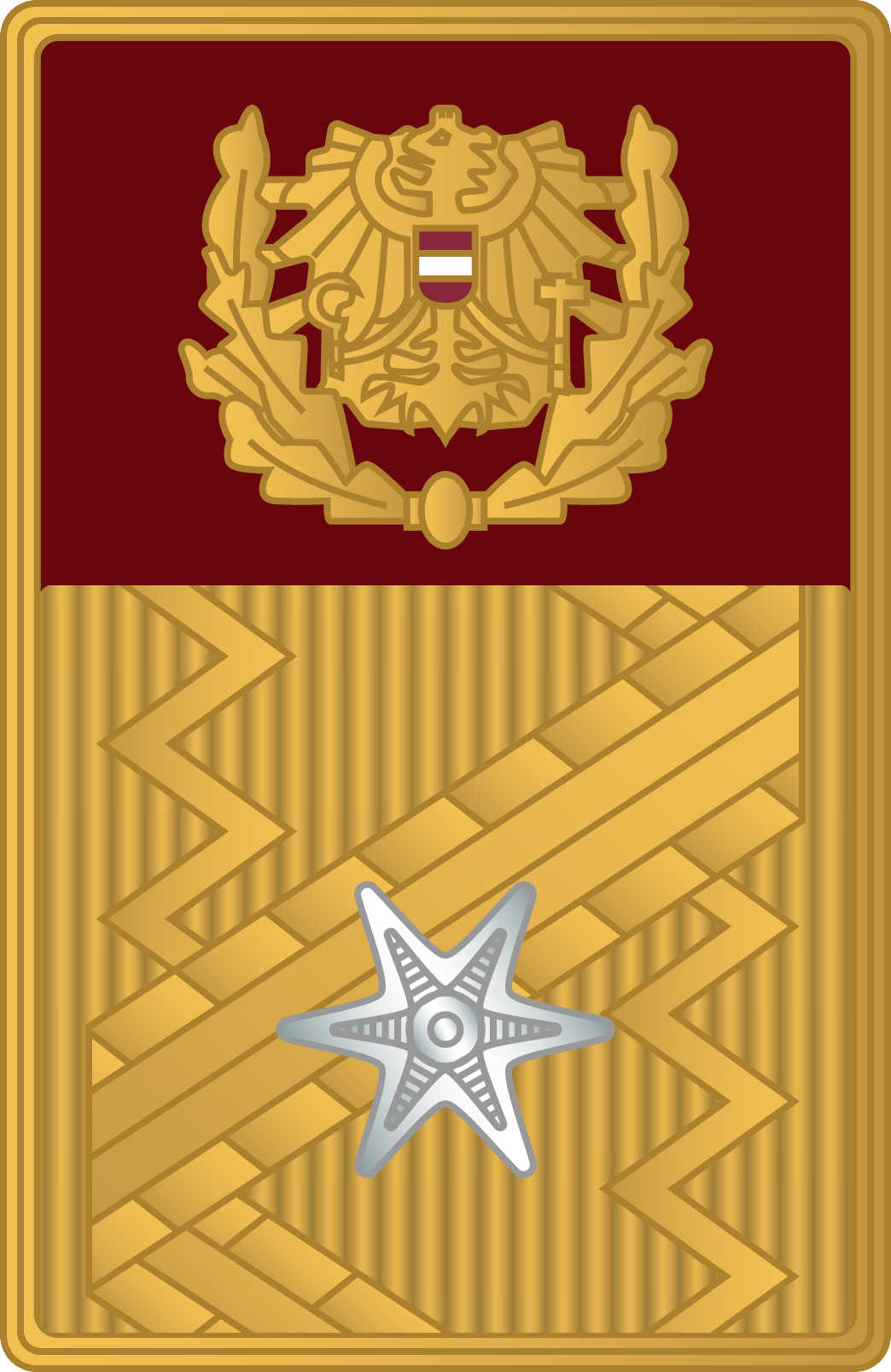
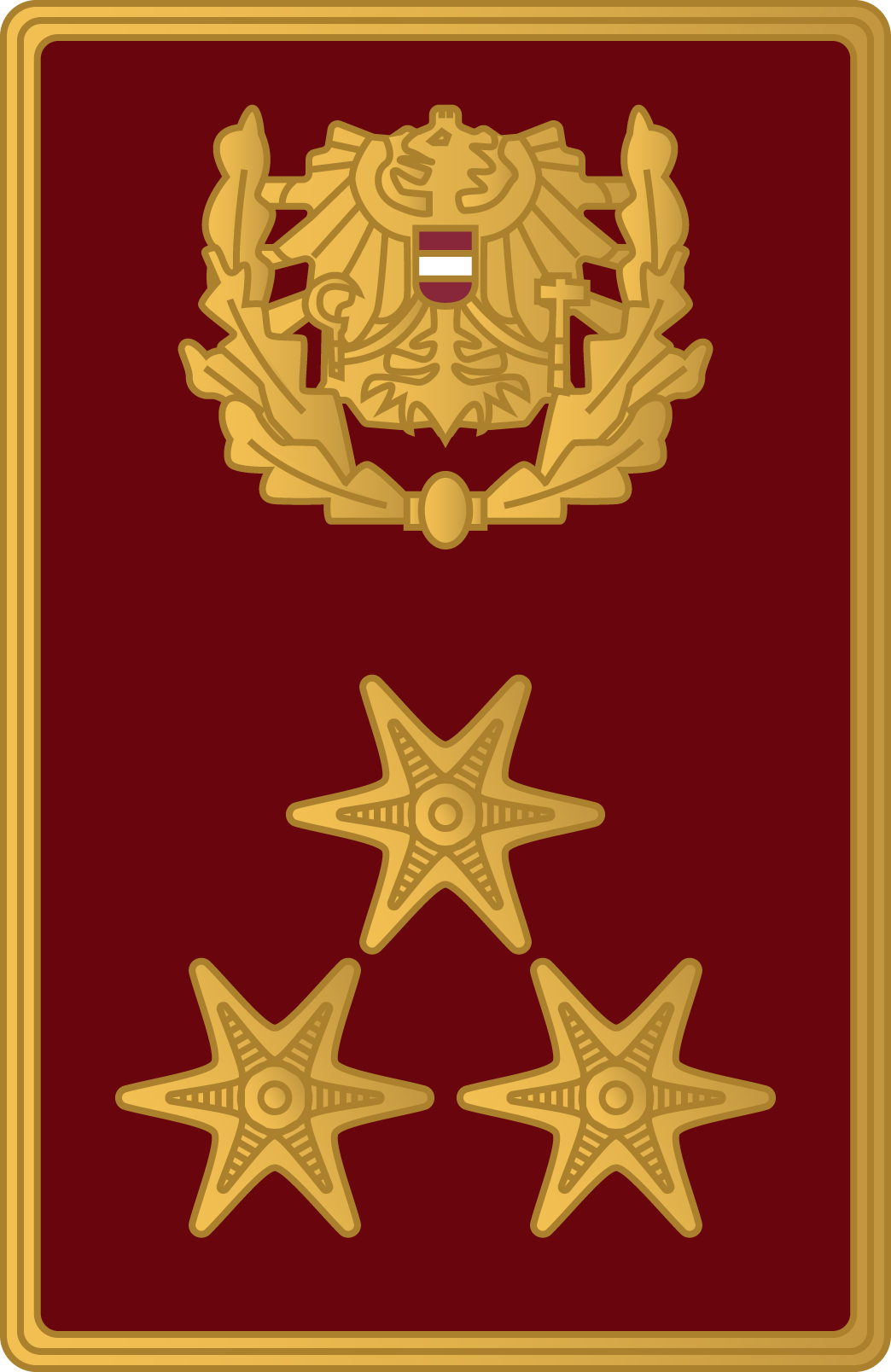
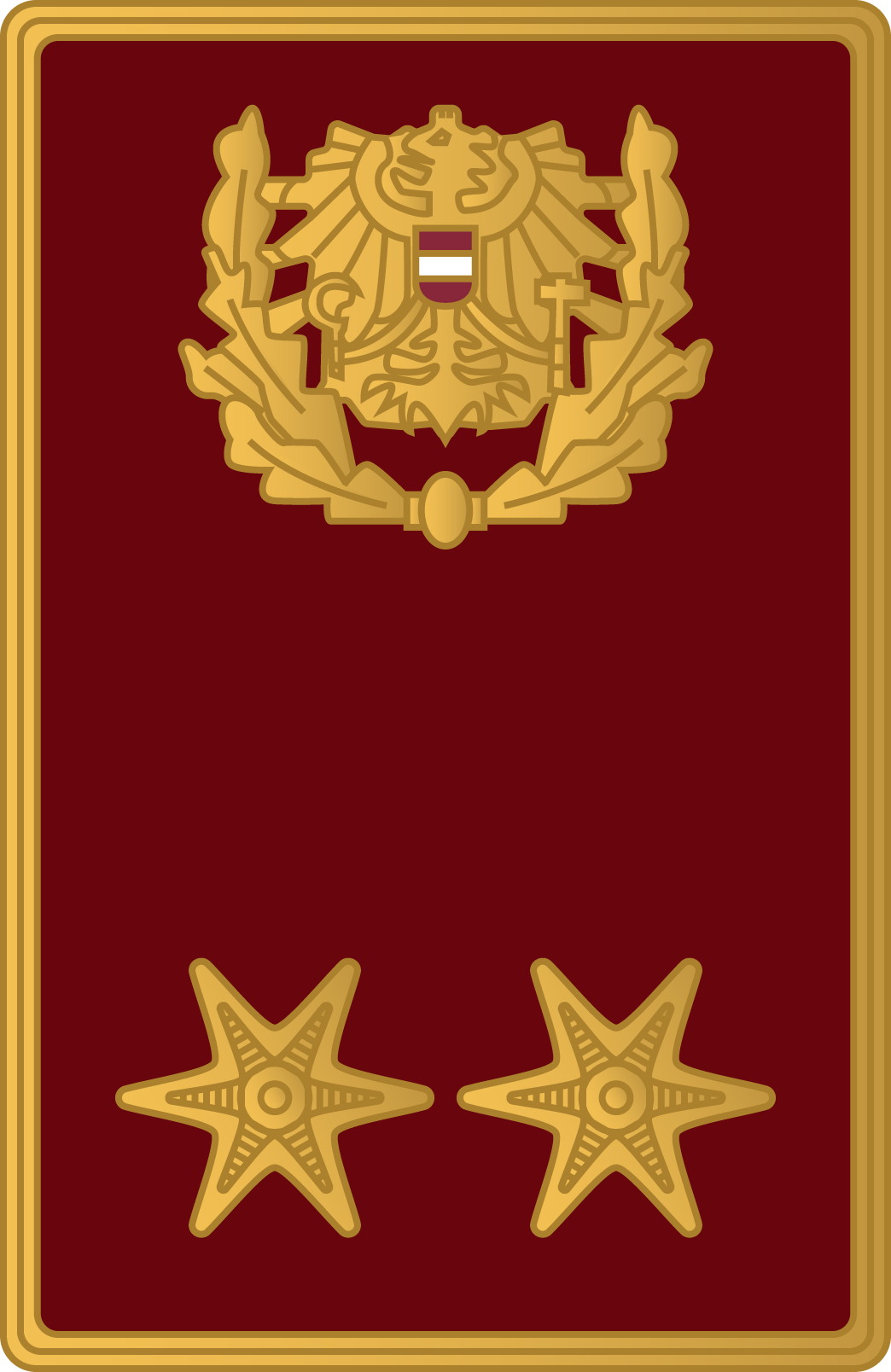
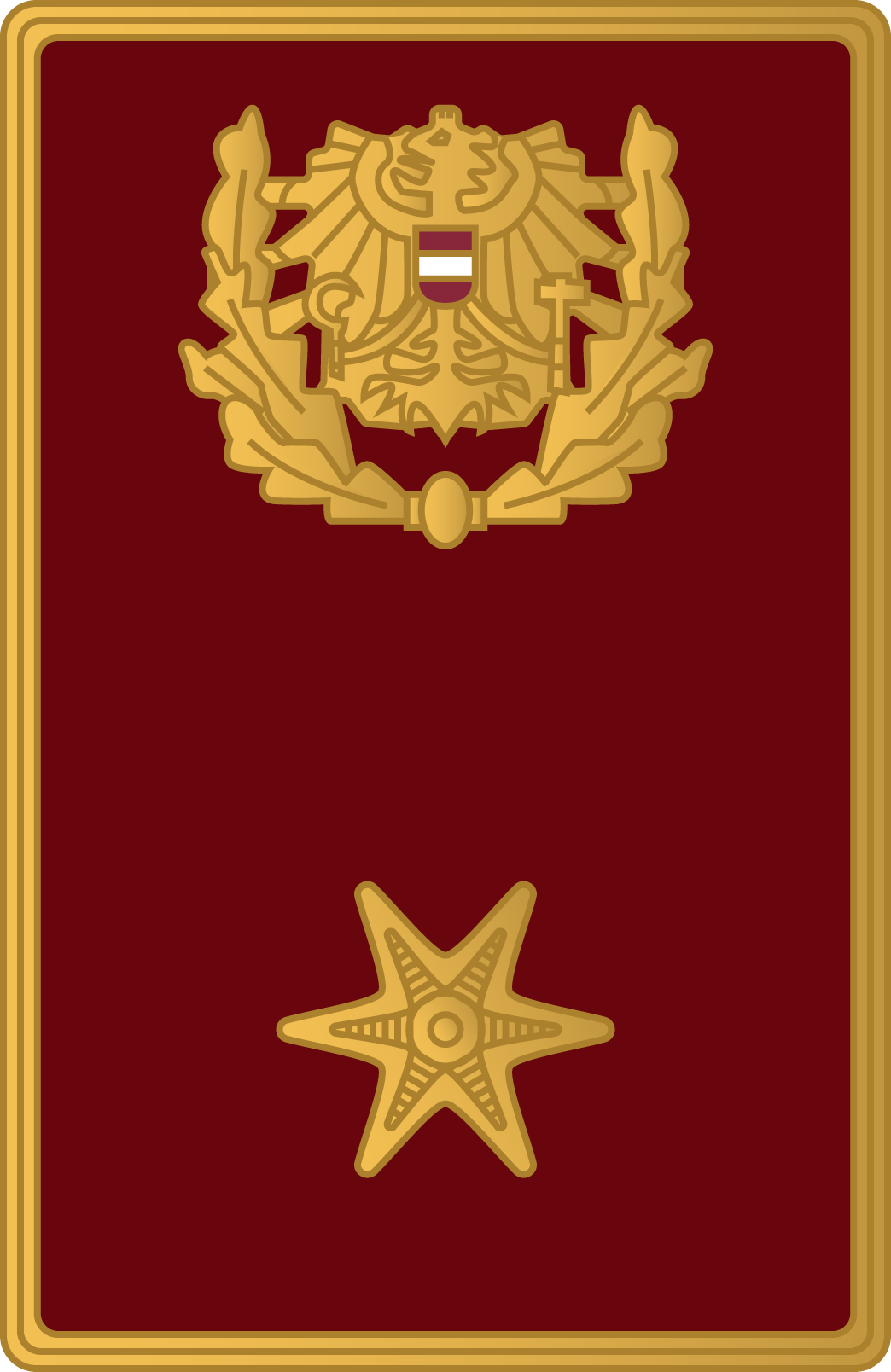
	General officers			Senior officers			Junior officers
(Austria) Austrian Federal Police
(Austria) Austrian Federal Police	General; Inspector general	Generalmajor; Deputy inspector general	Brigadier; Assistant inspector general	Oberst; Chief superintendent	Oberstleutnant; Superintendent	Major; Deputy superintendent	Hauptmann; Assistant superintendent	Oberleutnant; Divisional superintendent	Leutnant; Divisional assistant superintendent

Supervising officers and police officers

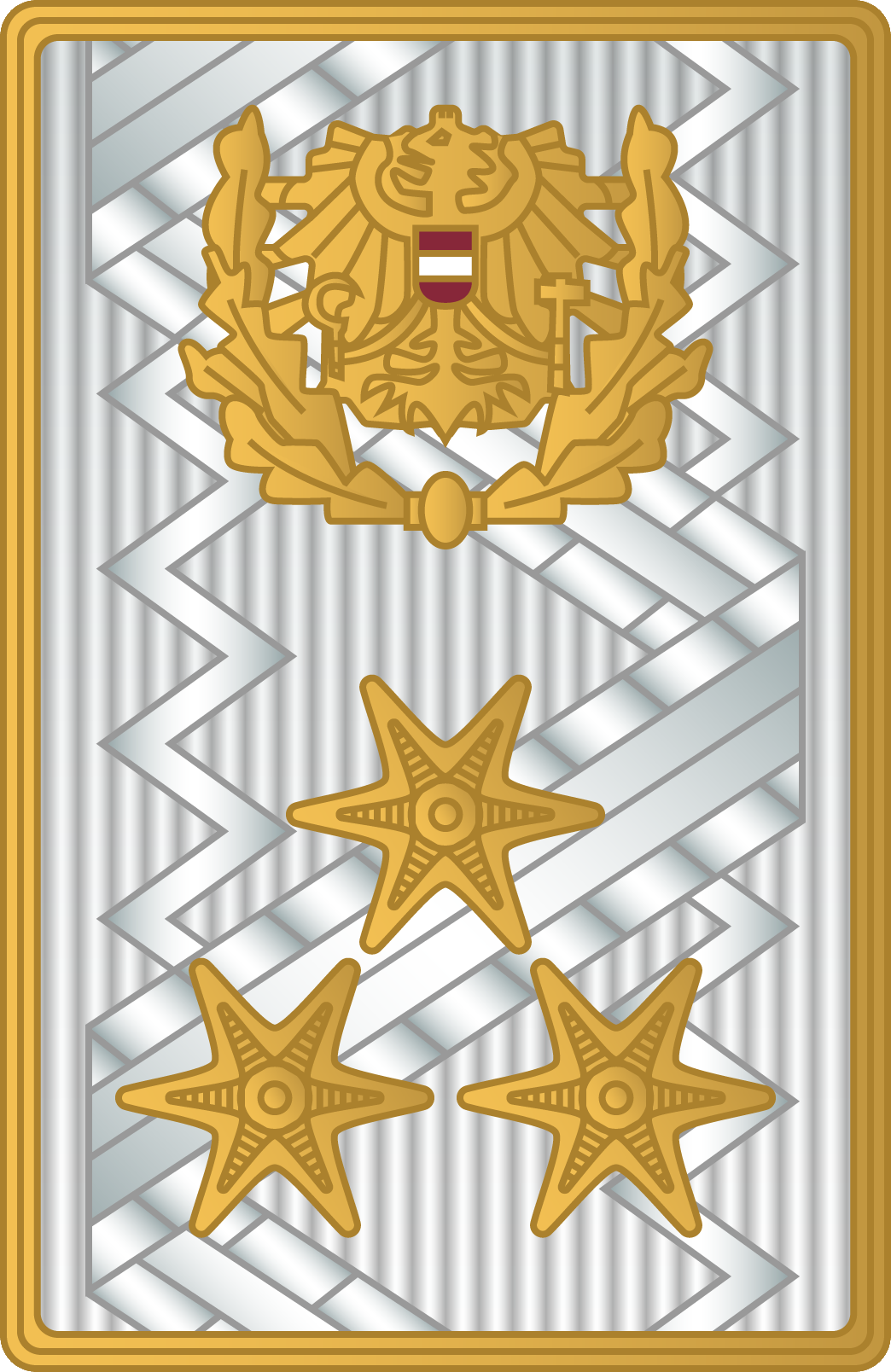
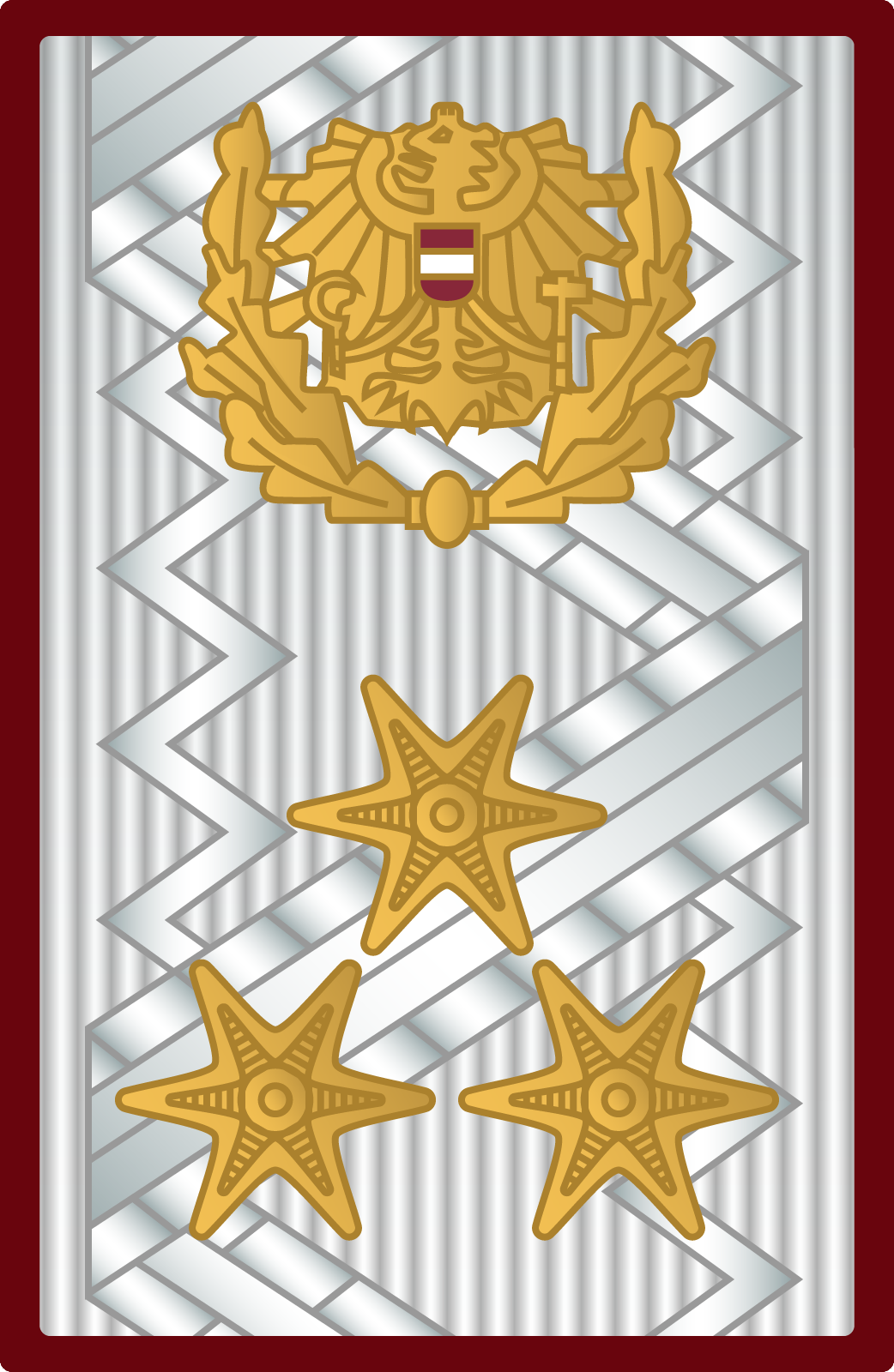
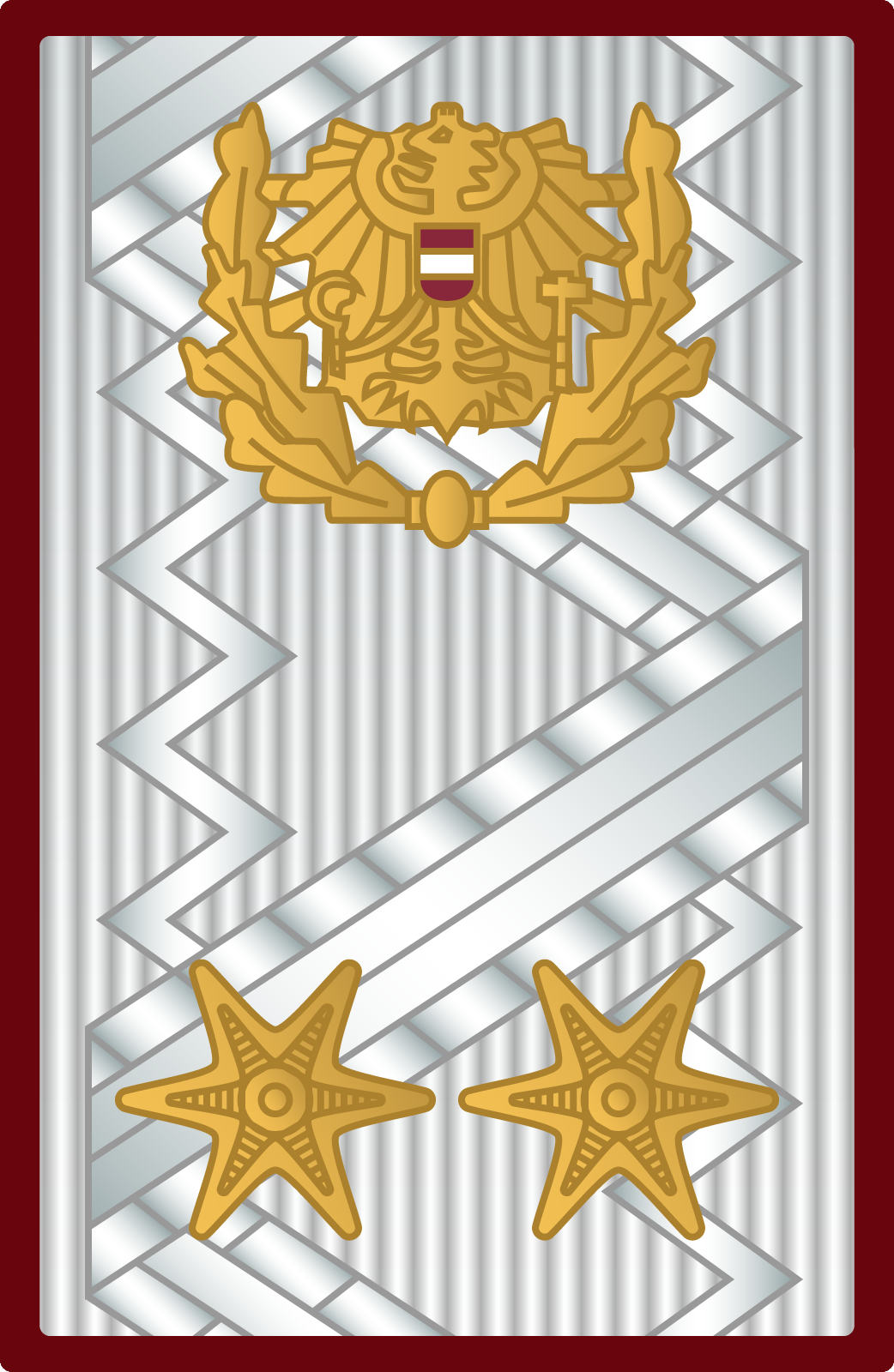
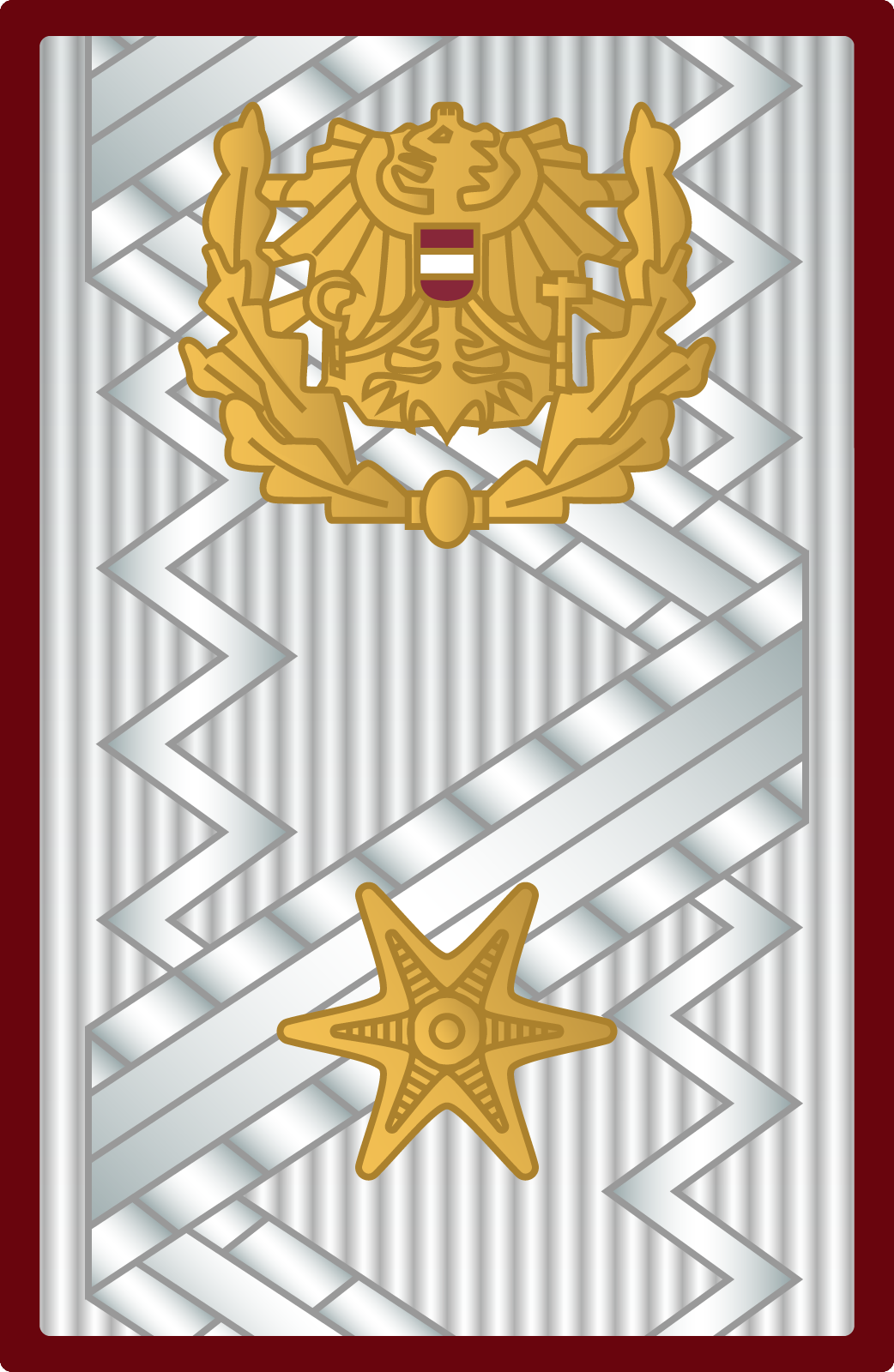
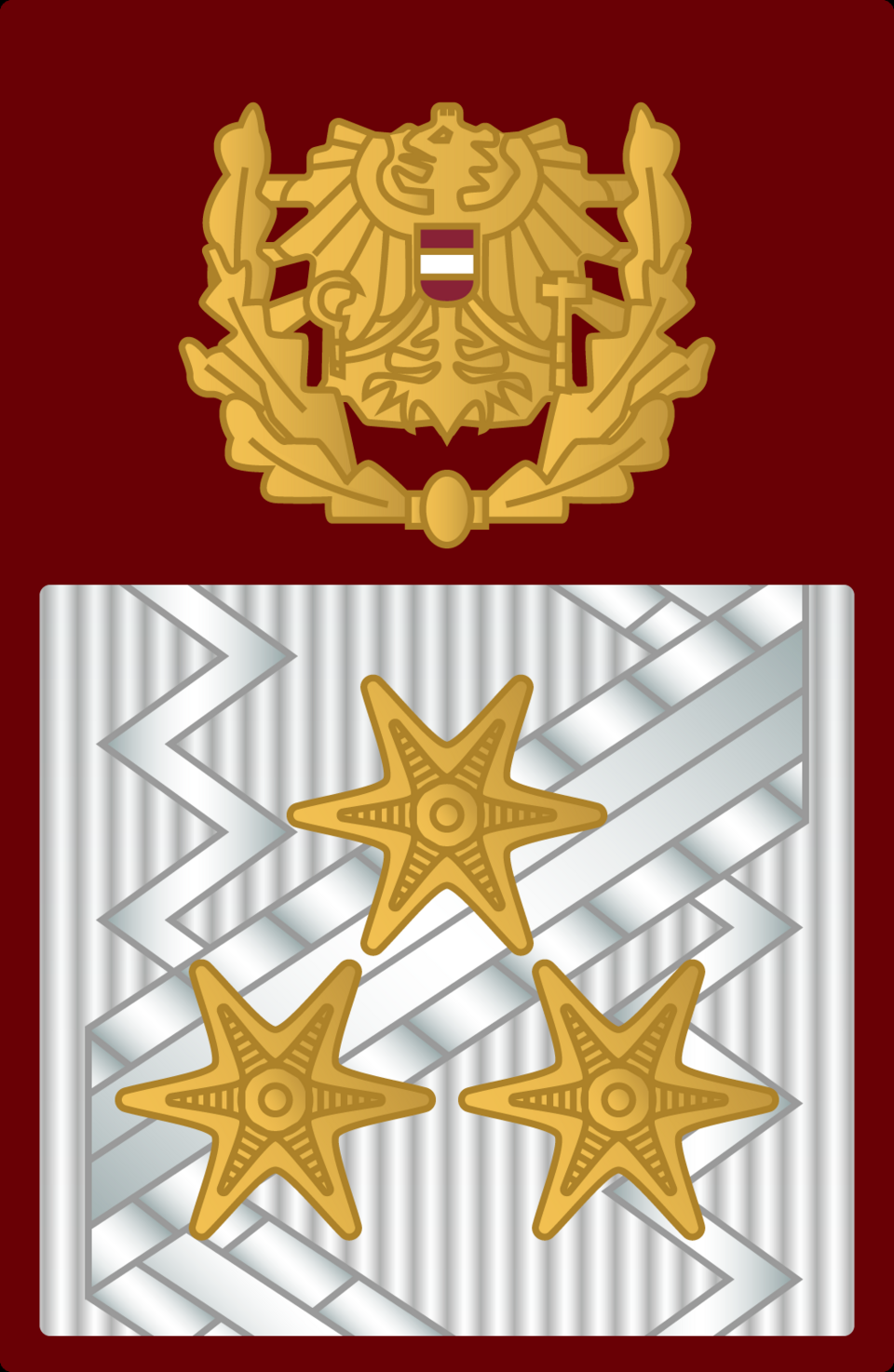
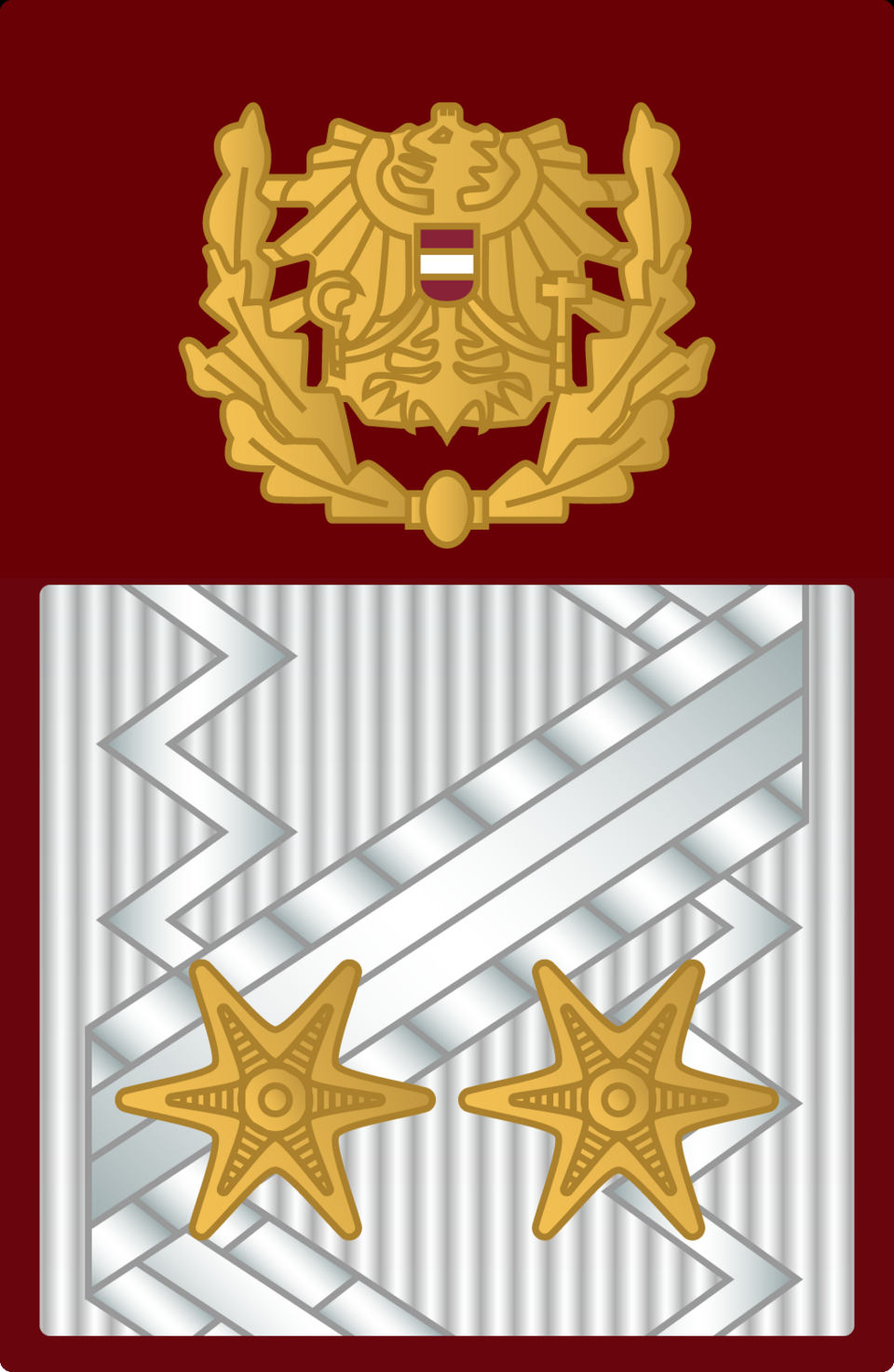
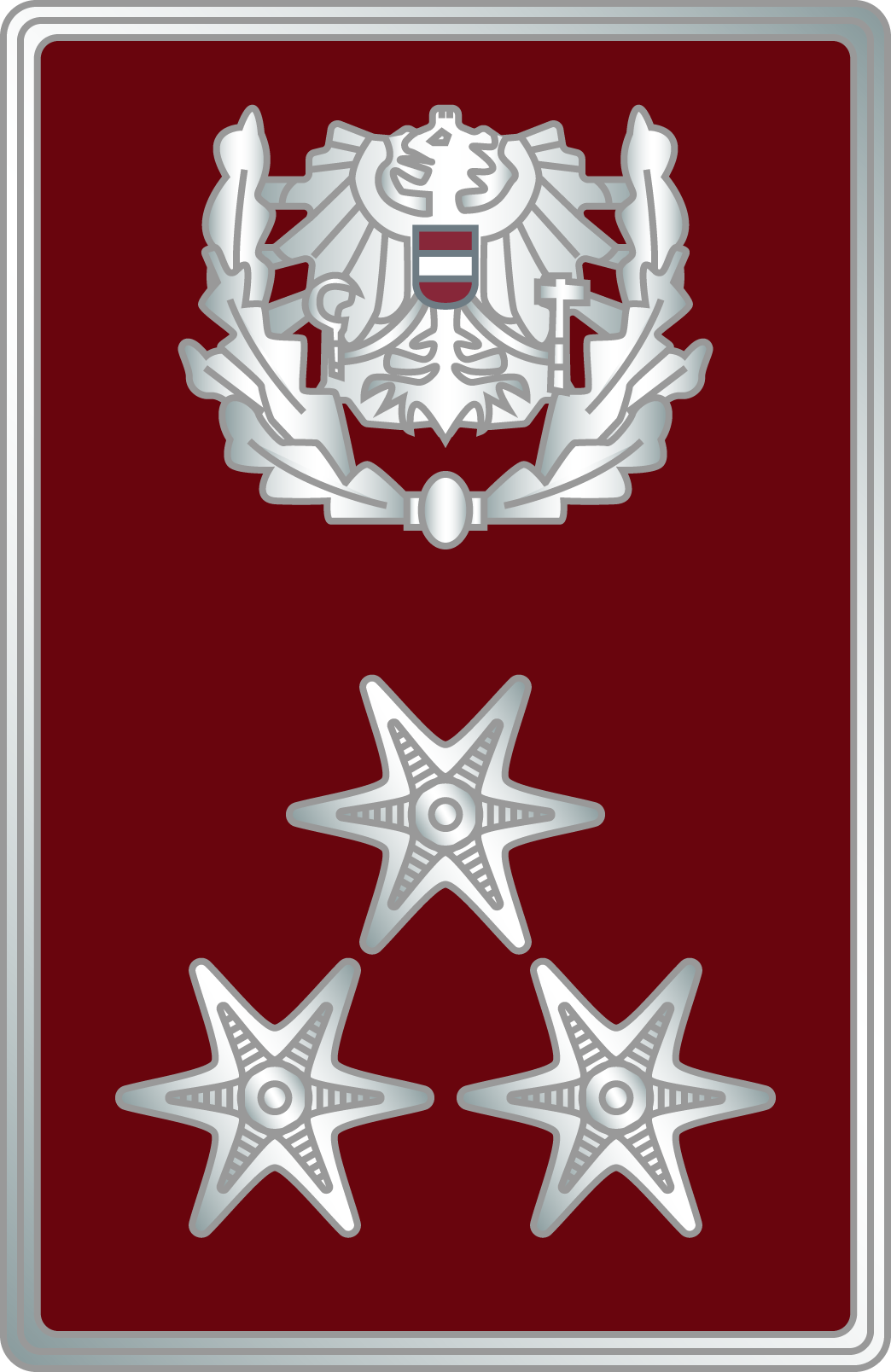
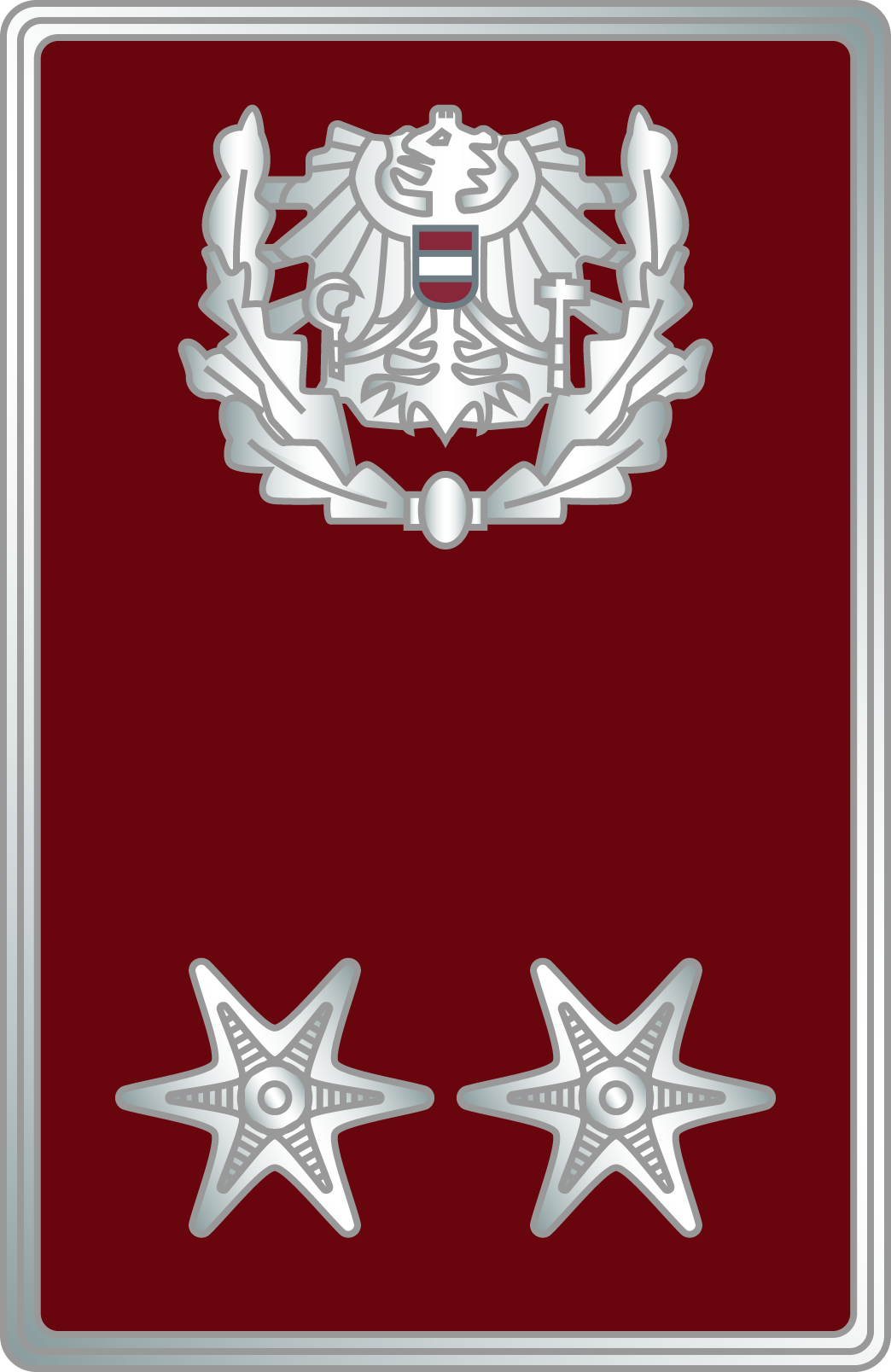
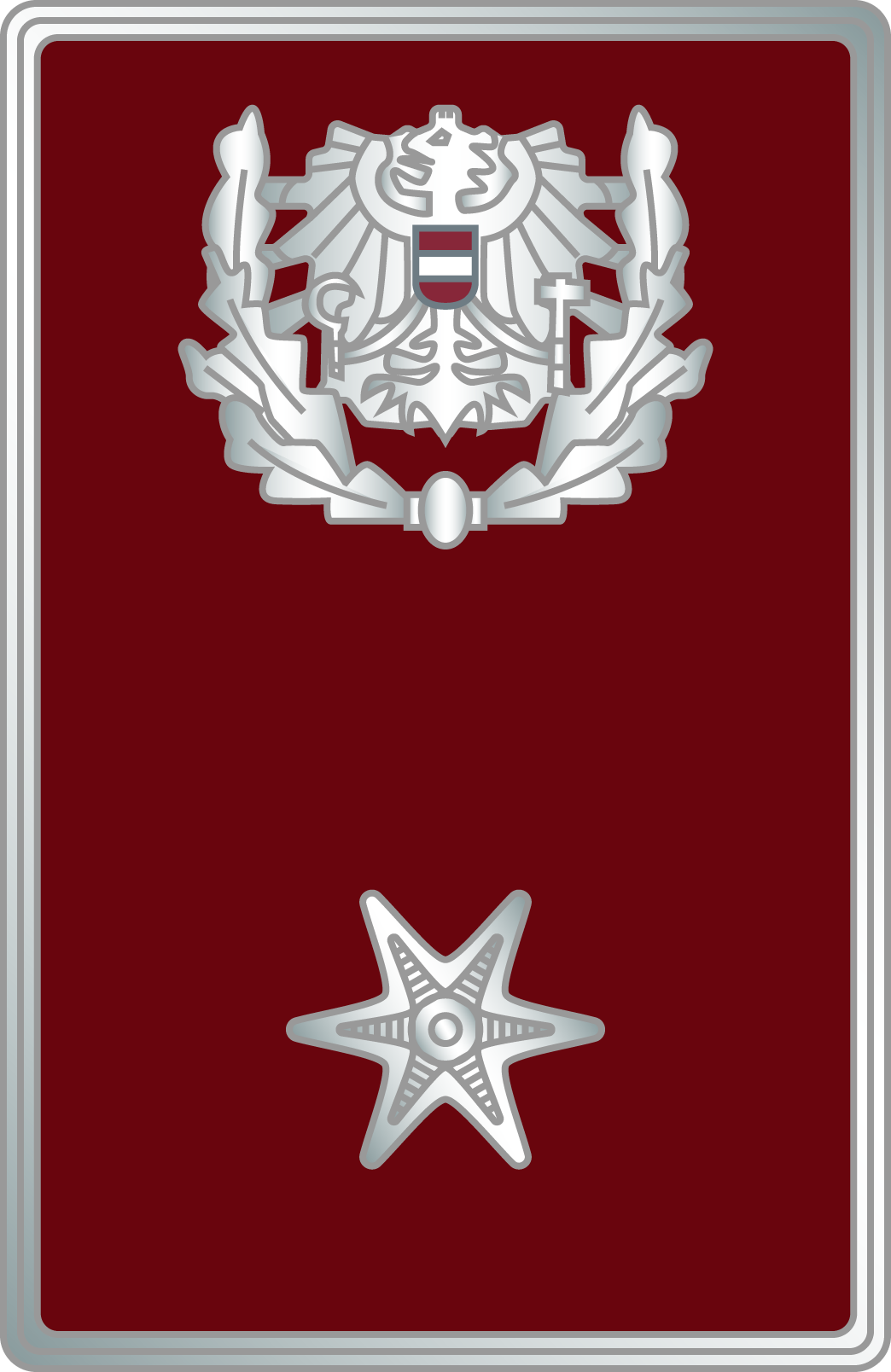
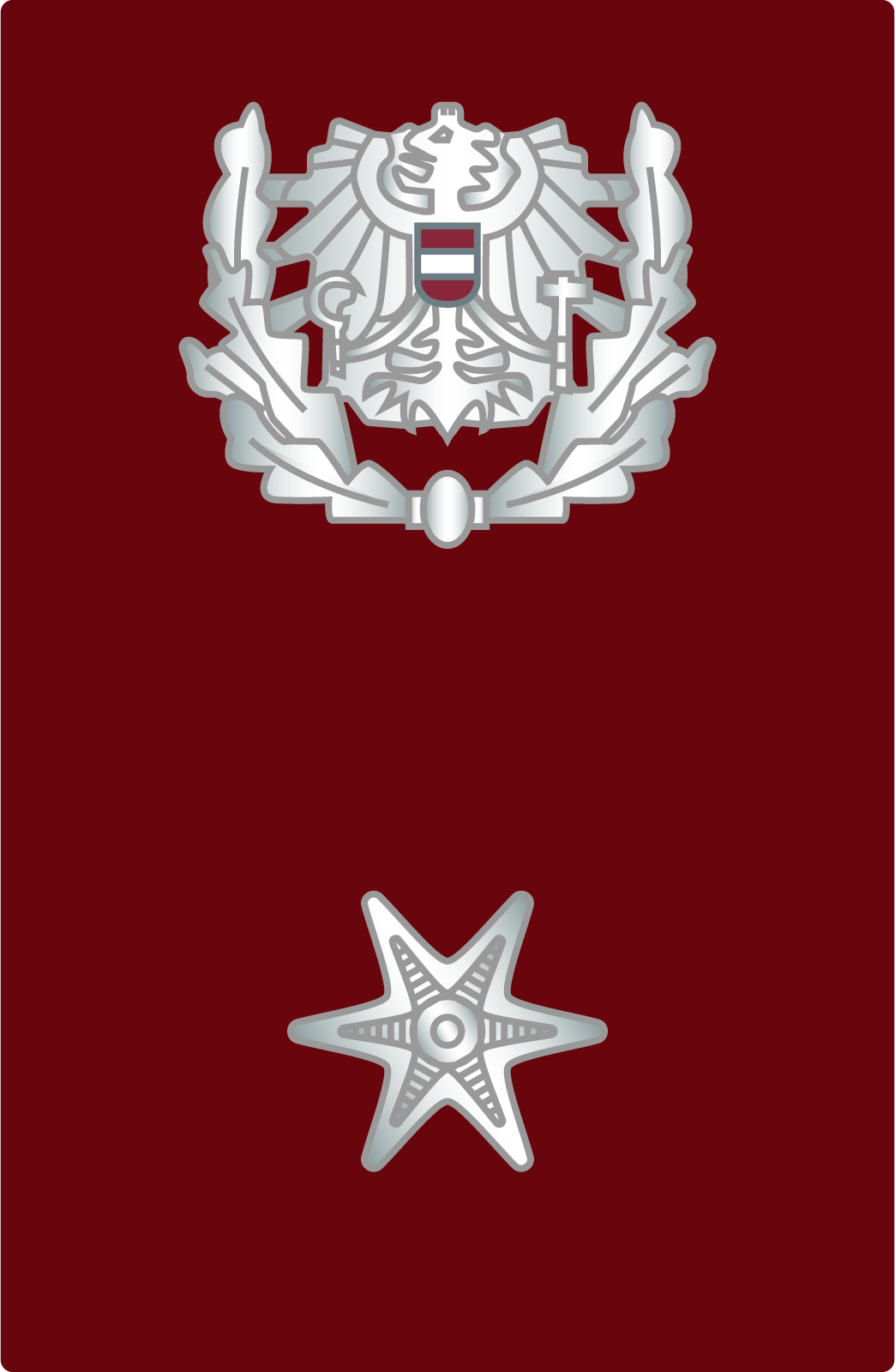
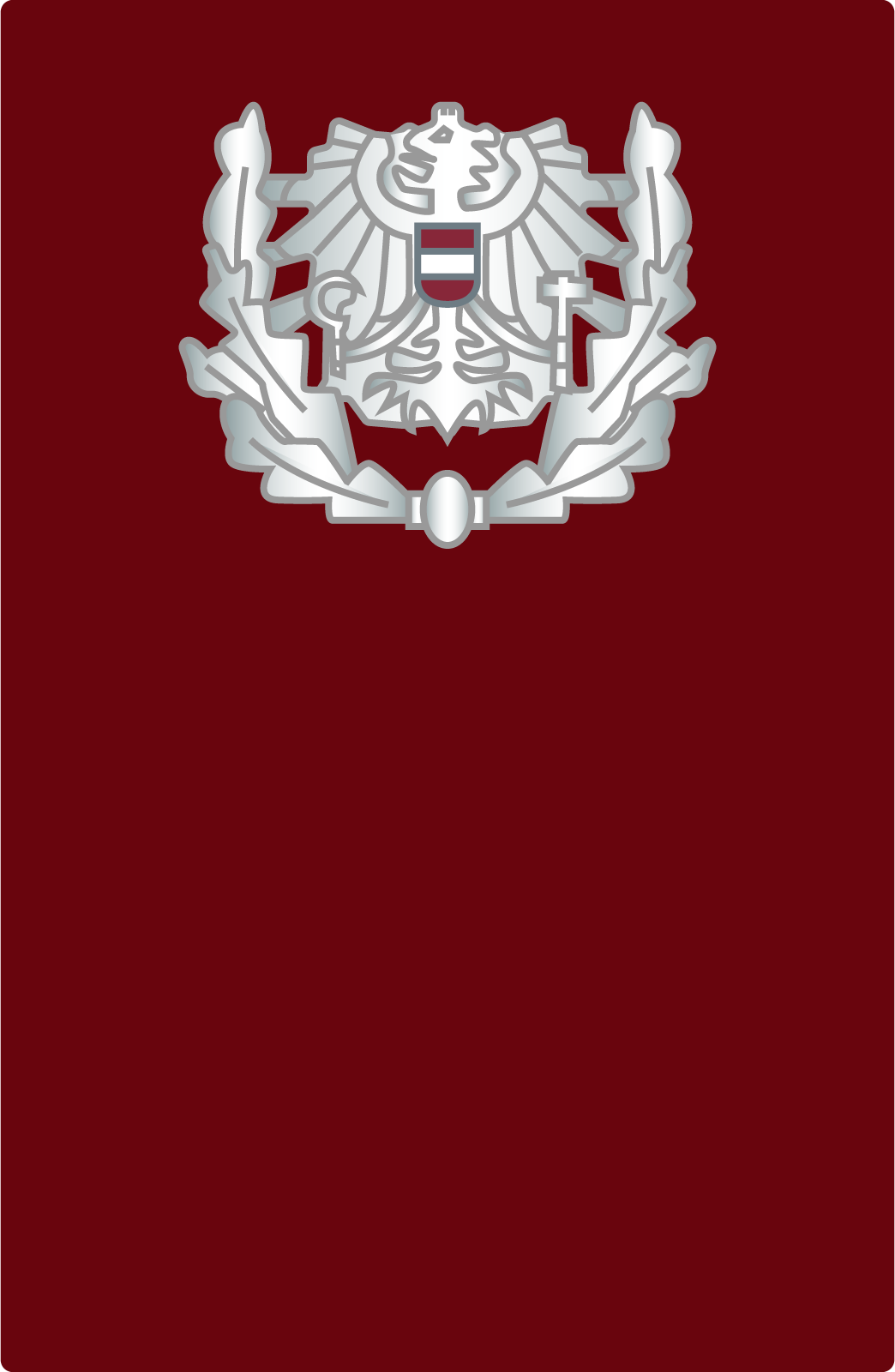
	Supervising officers						Police officers
(Austria) Austrian Federal Police
(Austria) Austrian Federal Police	Chefinspektor (Fgrp 7); Senior chief inspector	Chefinspektor (Fgrp 6); Chief inspector	Kontrollinspektor; Divisional inspector	Abteilungs- inspektor Sub-divisional inspector	Bezirksinspektor'; Station sergeant	Gruppeninspektor (E2a); Sergeant	Gruppeninspektor; Sergeant; Not in line of promotion	Revierinspektor; Senior constable	Inspektor; Constable	Inspektor GFP; Border guard constable	Aspirant; Probationary constable

Rank insignia of Legal officers

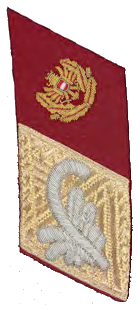
Hofrat
Senior Principal Legal Officer

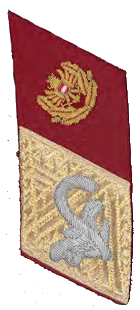
Oberrat
Principal Legal Officer

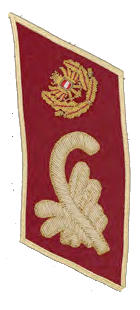
Rat
Senior Legal Officer

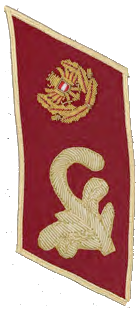
Kommissär
Legal Officer
Rank insignia of Police surgeons

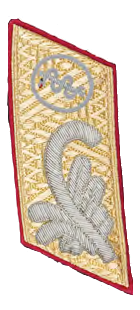
Chefarzt
Chief Surgeon of the Ministry of Interior

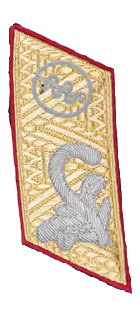
Chefarzt-Stellvertreter
Deputy Chief Surgeon of the Ministry of Interior

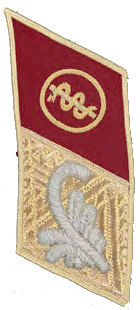
Chefarzt
Chief Surgeon

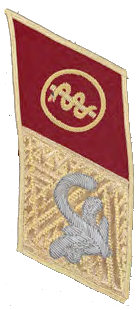
Chefarzt-Stellvertreter
Deputy Chief Surgeon

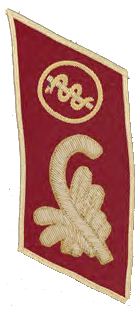
Vertragsarzt
Contract Surgeon
With 20 years service

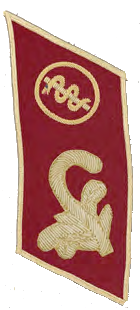
Vertragsarzt
Contract Surgeon
Rank insignia of Police pastors

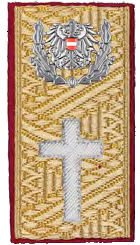
Bundeskurat

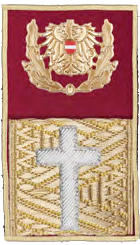
Landeskurat

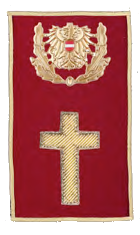
Bereichskurat
Rank insignia of Police musicians

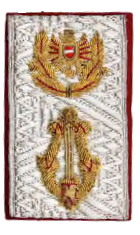
Kapellmeister

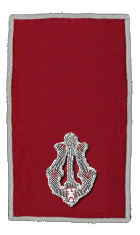
Gastmusiker

=== Historical ranks ===
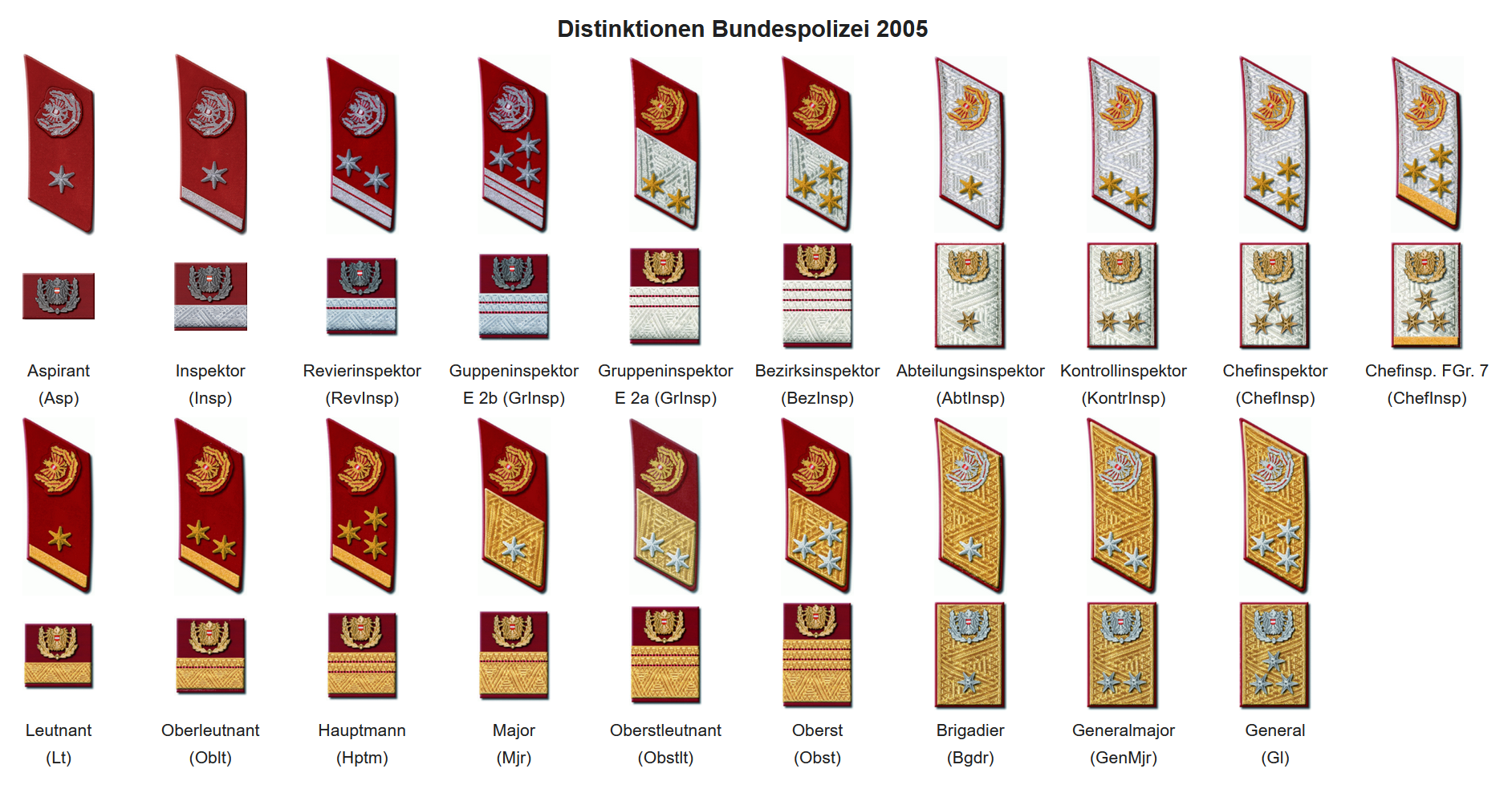
Ranks of the Federal Police guard body

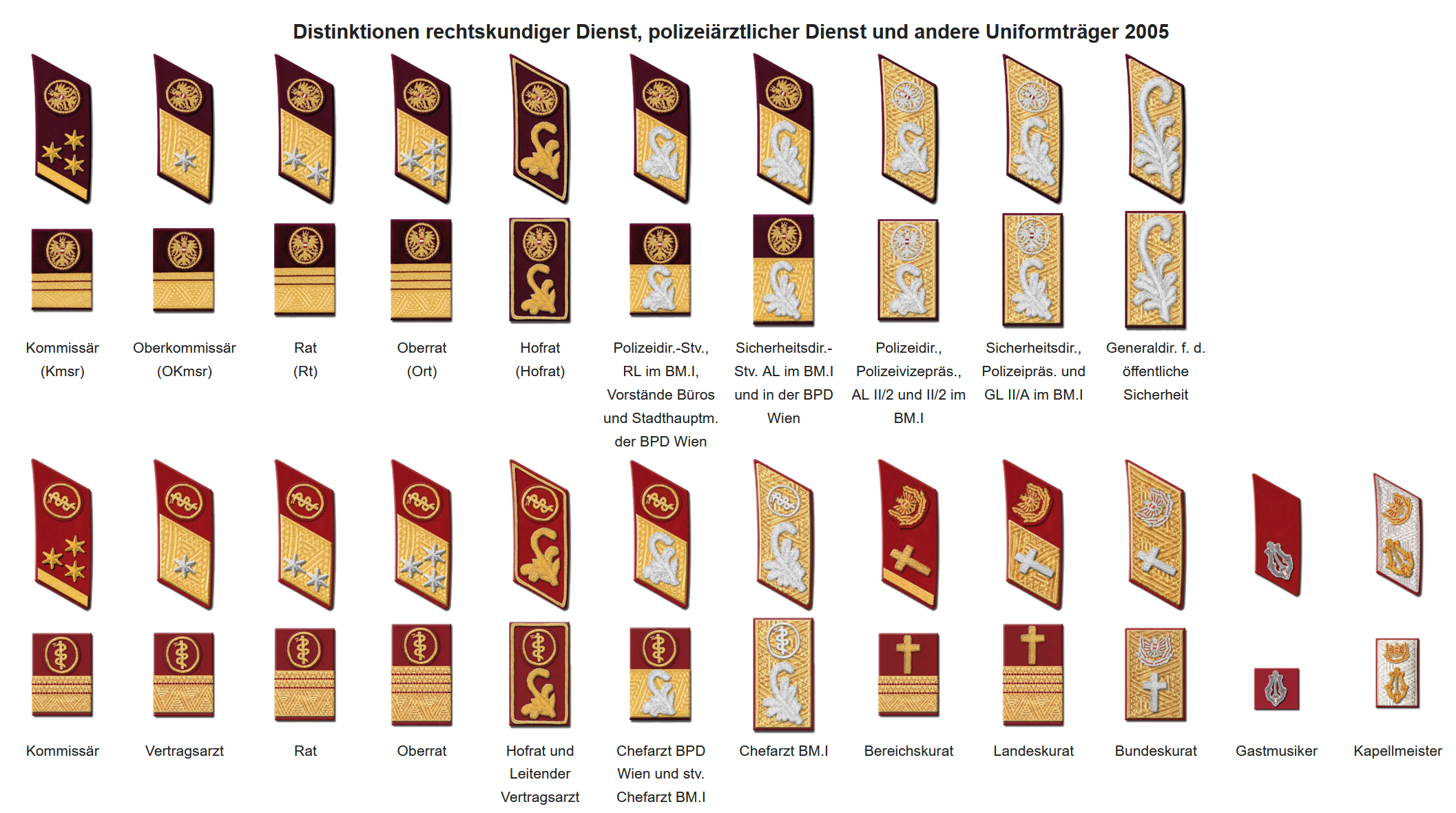
Ranks for legal and police medical services and other uniformed staff

== See also ==
- EKO Cobra
