= Ukrainian-American Concordia University =

University in Kyiv, Ukraine

Wisconsin International University (USA) Ukraine
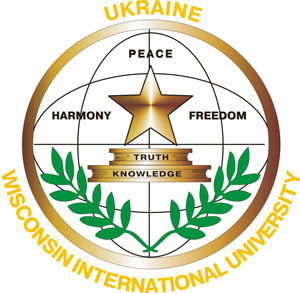
- Established: 1997
- Rector: Prof. Oleksandr Romanovskyi
- Students: 300
- Location: Kyiv, Ukraine
- Website: Official website

The Wisconsin International University (USA) in Ukraine (Ukrainian: Вісконсінський міжнародний університет (США) в Україні, romanized: Viskonsinsʹkyĭ mizhnarodnyĭ universytet (SShA) v Ukraïni, abbr. WIUU) is a liberal arts institute located in the center of Kyiv, the capital of Ukraine. The WIUU was established in 1997 as a private Higher Education Institution (HEI) Ukrainian-American Liberal Arts Institute “Wisconsin International University (USA) Ukraine” and offers an academic program that combines the practices of business education in Ukraine and in the USA. WIUU is and remains a unique Ukrainian HEI with training programs that lead to both Ukrainian state degrees (Bachelor of Management and Master of International Business Management) and American University degrees (Bachelor of Business Administration and Master of Business Administration).

== History ==
WIUU was established in 1997 by cooperation of the National Pedagogical Dragomanov University in Kyiv, Wisconsin International University (Wauwatosa, Wisconsin, USA) and Professor Oleksandr Romanovskiy. Over the years, WIUU has established cooperation programs with several other business schools and universities. In October 2017, in connection with the change of the American founder the WIUU was renamed the Private Higher Educational Establishment-Institute "UKRAINIAN-AMERICAN CONCORDIA UNIVERSITY". Its founders include the well known in the USA Concordia University Wisconsin with campuses in Mequon, Wisconsin and Ann Arbor, Michigan.

== Accreditation ==
WIUU is accredited by the Ministry of Education and Science, Youth and Sports of Ukraine and the State Accrediting Board of Ukraine to offer Bachelor and Master Programs. In 2012, WIUU's MBA program has been accredited by the German-Austrian-Swiss Foundation for International Business Administration Accreditation (FIBAA). FIBAA Headquartered in Bonn and has branch offices in Vienna and Zurich. Period of WIUU Master of Business Administration (MBA) Study Program FIBAA Accreditation: September 27, 2012 until the end of 2017 summer semester. In 2014 the university successfully passed the accreditation of its Bachelor of Business Administration (BBA) Study Program from FIBAA for a period from July 11, 2014 until August 31, 2019. For several years the university has been a member of the American Accreditation Council for Business Schools and Programs (ACBSP).

== Degree Programs ==
Degree Offered	Diplomas Obtained
Joint Ukrainian - American bachelor's degree in Business Administration and Management	Ukrainian State Diploma -Bachelor of Management (BM) International Diploma -Bachelor of Business Administration (BBA)
American Degree - Bachelor of Business Administration	International Diploma -Bachelor of Business Administration (BBA)
Ukrainian Degree - Bachelor of Management	Ukrainian State Diploma -Bachelor of Management (BM)
Bachelor of International Business Degree	Ukrainian and International Diplomas in International Business
American Degree - Master of Business Administration	International Diploma -Master of Business Administration (MBA)
Ukrainian Degree - Master of International Management	Ukrainian State Diploma -Master of International Management (MIM)

== International partner universities ==
Students have the opportunity to practice, study and train abroad (the US and Western Europe) in order to broaden their knowledge on culture, politics, economics and languages of the host countries. WIUU offers a range of summer and winter programs in Florida, Heidelberg, Munich, London, Plymouth, Madrid, Paris and Strasbourg. Courses and internship taken at WIUU partner universities are recognized by WIUU.

The WIUU maintains relations to a number of partner universities and institutions:

- Concordia University Wisconsin (USA)
- University of Minnesota Crookston (USA)
- Indiana Wesleyan University (USA)
- East Central University (Ada, Oklahoma, USA)
- Schiller International University (USA-Great Britain-Germany-France-Spain)
- Richmond, The American International University in London (Great Britain)
- University College Plymouth St Mark & St John (Great Britain)
- Institute of Commercial Management (Great Britain)
- Trier University (Germany)
- University of Applied Sciences, Worms (Germany)
- University of Koblenz and Landau (Germany)
- Ukrainian Free University (Germany)
- Kazakh-American Free University (Kazakhstan)
- Varna University of Management (Bulgaria)

== Partner organizations and institutions (domestic and international) ==
The university maintains relations to a number of partner organizations and institutions:

- Ukrainian Chamber of Commerce and Industry (Ukraine)
- Kyiv Chamber of Commerce and Industry (Ukraine)
- Education USA Advising Center (Ukraine)
- German-Ukrainian Society of Economics and Science (Germany)
- HighMark, INC (Georgia, USA)
- Precedent Academics (Indianapolis, USA)
- Co-Serve International (Oregon, USA)
- Accreditation Council for Business Schools and Programs (USA)
- The Institute of Commercial Management (Great Britain)
- American Chamber of Commerce (Ukraine)
- Diamond FMS (Ukraine)
- OVB Holding AG, Cologne, Germany

== Student life ==
Students and faculty organize various activities outside of the curriculum, such as sports or cultural events. WIUU's international connections and exchange programs enable students to receive insights into foreign customs and traditions, often leading to multi-cultural entertainment programs. There is also a weekly student-made newspaper.

== Staff, honorable doctors and professors ==
The university's academic program is supported by a body of lecturers from various fields. In addition, WIUU regularly gives students the opportunity to learn from guest lecturers, honorary doctors and professors. Among these are:

- Karl Beck, former director of the US Peace Corps
- Jörn Block, professor at University of Trier, Germany
- Hansjürgen Doss, honorary consul of Ukraine
- Douglas Gardner, former United Nations coordinator in Ukraine
- Axel Haas, lecturer at Trier University, Germany
- John Herbst, former US Ambassador to Ukraine
- Moritz Hunzinger, PR and communications specialist
- Adalbert Lhota, former honorary consul general of Austria
- Michael Ruiss, Entrepreneur and publisher of TOP Magazine Frankfurt Rhine-Main, Germany
- Stephan Schupbach, professor at Frankfurt University of Applied Sciences
- Peter Spary, secretary general of German-Ukrainian association for economy and science
- Dietmar Stüdemann, former ambassador of Germany
- Gert-René Polli, Former Head of the Austrian Internal Security Service: Bundesamt für Verfassungsschutz und Terrorismusbekämpfung
- Anastasiia Tsybuliak, Professor of the Department of International Economics, Business and Management. Doctor of Economic Sciences, PhD in Political Sciences
- Joachim Bentz, Marketing Director of the international corporation Imperial Tobacco Ukraine
- Jeff Evans, Top salesman at Roche Laboratories and AstraZeneca
