= Mouhanad Khorchide =

German-Palestinian sociologist and university teacher

- Born: 6 September 1971 (age 55); Beirut, Lebanon
- Occupations: Sociologist; Islamic theologian
- Employer: University of Münster
- Known for: Islamic theology and religious education

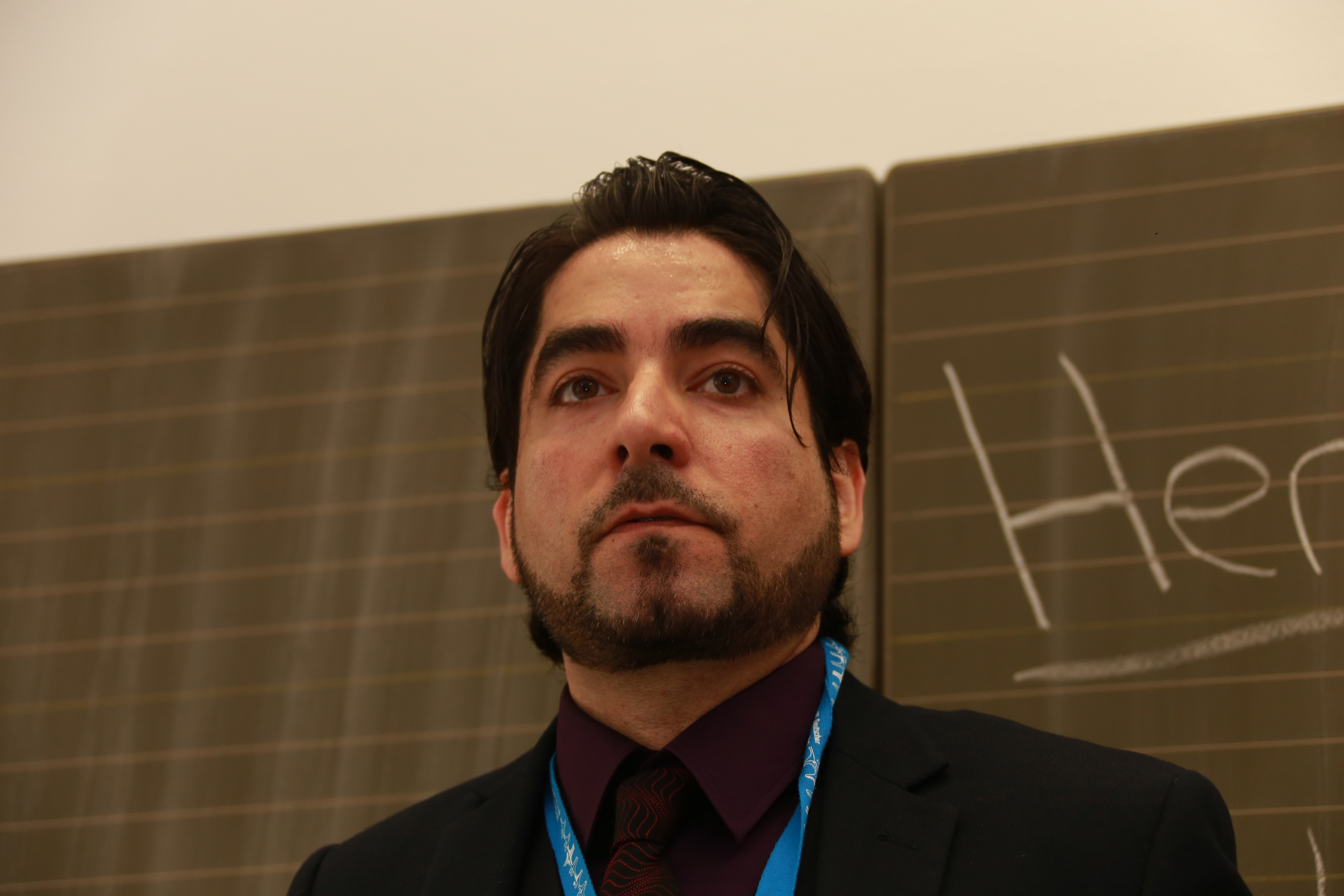
Prof Mouhanad Khorchide

Mouhanad Khorchide (مُهَنَّد خُورْشِيد, * 6 September 1971 in Beirut) is an Austrian sociologist and Islamic theologian. He is Professor of Islamic Religious Education and Director of the Center for Islamic Theology (ZIT) at the University of Münster in Germany.

== Personal life and studies ==
Khorchide grew up in Saudi Arabia, where his Palestinian family had taken refuge. At the age of 18, he emigrated to Vienna, Austria. There he studied sociology and became an Austrian citizen. Parallel to his studies in Austria, Khorchide studied Islam in Beirut at the university Imam al-Auzāʿī in Beirut. From 2006 to 2010, he worked at the University of Vienna in the fields of Islamic studies and Islamic pedagogy. Parallel to this, he was Imam of a mosque near Vienna.

Khorchide spent a considerable amount of time at the Shura Mosque in Vienna’s Leopoldstadt district, which was under the leadership of the internationally renowned preacher Adnan Ibrahim. Khorchide, who was deeply impressed by Ibrahim—himself of Palestinian descent—explicitly thanked him for his inspiration in his dissertation (2009). In his book Gott glaubt an den Menschen (2015), he also recognized Ibrahim as a “contemporary reformer.”

For his 2008 dissertation Islamic Religious Education Between Integration and Parallel Society: Attitudes of Islamic Religious Teachers at Public Schools, Mouhanad Khorchide surveyed approximately half of the 400 Islamic religious teachers in Austria. According to Khorchide a significant minority of respondents rejected democratic and constitutional principles. As a result, representatives of all political parties called for stricter regulations. The Community of Muslim believers in Austria opposed the findings, describing them as “defamation.”

Since July 20, 2010, Khorchide has succeeded Sven Kalisch as Professor of Islamic Religious Education at the University of Münster, where Islamic religious education teachers have been trained since fall 2010.

In July 2020, Mouhanad Khorchide presented the Austrian Documentation Center for Political Islam together with Lorenzo Vidino and the responsible Integration Minister Susanne Raab (ÖVP). Since then, Khorchide has headed the scientific advisory board of this center.

The major Muslim associations in Germany reject Khorchide's approach, or at least look at it with much suspicion.

== Positions ==
During the campaign for the 2017 Austrian legislative election, Mouhanad Khorchide expressed support for then-ÖVP leader Sebastian Kurz. In a commentary published in the daily newspaper Der Standard under the headline “Why Sebastian Kurz is not an Islam-hater,” Khorchide wrote that Kurz had long recognized the dangers of Political Islam, which, according to him, divides society.

Mouhanad Khorchide is a supporter of the European Citizens’ Initiative Stop Extremism, founded in 2017, which aims to protect people in Europe from the consequences of extremism. In 2023, the magazine Profil revealed that Stop Extremism was a campaign directed from the Emirates targeting the Muslim Brotherhood.

In spring 2021, the Austrian government under Kurz II introduced a new criminal offense of “religiously motivated extremist association” (§ 247b of the Criminal Code). Initially, the Austrian People's Party (ÖVP) targeted what it referred to as “Political Islam” and the Muslim Brotherhood. However, the coalition partner, The Greens, advocated for a religiously neutral wording, leading to an adjustment in the legal text. Several courts and legal scholars criticized the introduction of the offense, citing its vagueness and lack of necessity. In a statement to the National Council, Mouhanad Khorchide, chair of the scientific advisory board of the Documentation Centre for Political Islam, welcomed the new provision and argued that it was particularly applicable to the Muslim Brotherhood.

== Criticism and Reception ==
In 2009, sociologist Henrik Kreutz, a professor at the University of Nuremberg, criticized Mouhanad Khorchide’s doctoral dissertation as “pseudo-scientific hocus-pocus” and “deception.” Khorchide rejected the allegations in a written response, which Kreutz in turn described as “an unfounded accusation.” Kreutz further claimed that Khorchide had failed to deliver on promises regarding additional data analyses and called for the empirical material collected by Khorchide to be thoroughly reviewed by independent researchers as part of a secondary analysis. In another guest commentary published in the Austrian daily Die Presse, Kreutz accused Khorchide of committing a “serious methodological error,” stating: “The assertion that Islamic religious teachers are intolerant and fanatical can be dismissed as a false allegation.” Further criticism of the dissertation came from education researcher Stefan Hopmann, professor of education at the University of Vienna, who declared that he would not have accepted the dissertation, describing Khorchide’s findings as “pure nonsense from a scientific point of view.”

Islamic studies scholar Rainer Brunner, a lecturer at the University of Freiburg, criticized Mouhanad Khorchide for a publication in Herder Korrespondenz, stating: “Indicative of such an apologetic stance is, for example, Khorchide 2010, 20, who touches on the La ikrah verse in a manner that is both incidental and tendentious in just one sentence: ‘And finally, religious freedom is mandated: ›There is no compulsion in religion (sic!)‹ (...).’”

In a critical review of Islam is Mercy, Islamic studies scholar Muhammad Sameer Murtaza argued that the book’s core thesis—namely, that ethical and unethical lifestyles do not differ in the end because God treats everyone equally—would imply that believers could ultimately coexist with tyrants like Adolf Hitler and Josef Stalin. While disbelief must be examined in a nuanced manner, Murtaza claimed that Khorchide’s approach was “too simplistic.” He also found it surprising that Khorchide consistently failed to describe the God-human relationship using the term rabb-abd, suggesting unfamiliarity with the concept. Murtaza rejected what he called a “trivialization of God,” whereby all traits unpleasant to humans are ignored. He demanded theological reflections that are well-founded, intersubjectively comprehensible, and logically coherent, arguing that without such criteria, the statements remain merely subjective claims. Murtaza concluded: “Since the theologian consistently avoids working in a scholarly manner, such theses can only be dismissed as personal opinions.” That same year, Khorchide sent a letter to Murtaza’s employer, the Stiftung Weltethos, threatening legal consequences, as Murtaza had publicly called his faith into question. Murtaza made the letter public and accused Khorchide of being unable to handle criticism and of being easily offended.

In 2021, Islamic studies scholar Rüdiger Lohlker, professor at the University of Vienna, criticized the media’s characterization of Mouhanad Khorchide as an “Islamic studies scholar” on his blog. Lohlker accused Khorchide of merely saying “anything” about topics associated with Islam.

As part of the evaluation of Islamic religious education in North Rhine-Westphalia (NRW), a study on students’ attitudes toward Islamic religious instruction was published under the direction of Mouhanad Khorchide in March 2024. In May 2024, Khorchide presented the findings to the NRW state parliament. According to the results, there is a positive correlation between reform-oriented attitudes and democratic values, whereas affiliation with Turkish-Islamic organizations correlates negatively. However, the German Society for Islamic-Theological Studies (DEGITS) criticized methodological weaknesses in the study, such as the use of simplified and suggestive questions. DEGITS further noted that the study employed a reductionist approach and black-and-white phrasing. Ethical concerns were also raised, with DEGITS alleging that students were instrumentalized by being invited to participate under pretenses that deviated from the actual research questions. The Association of Muslim Teachers (VML) joined the criticism, likewise pointing to biased and leading questions and response options.

Political Islam

In 2018, the Austrian government under Kurz I ordered the closure of seven mosques as part of its campaign against “Political Islam.” Mouhanad Khorchide supported the measure, stating that it was “clearly a violation of the law.” However, the Vienna Administrative Court later ruled the closures unlawful, allowing the mosques to resume operations.

In 2020, Islamic studies scholar Thomas Bauer, professor at the University of Münster, criticized Mouhanad Khorchide’s remarks on Political Islam in his review of Gottes falsche Anwälte. Der Verrat am Islam Bauer wrote:

“This insistence on a single truth—one’s own—and the denial of history are features of fundamentalism, in which K. aligns himself with Wahhabis and Salafists. For this reason, he does not regard them as the most dangerous Muslims, but instead the proponents of ‘Political Islam’: ‘We are now confronted with a much more dangerous ideology—that of Political Islam. It is more dangerous because it attempts to infiltrate society subtly. While the Salafist openly embraces his Salafist ideology [...], the follower of Political Islam appears well integrated, is often well-educated, fashion-conscious, and if male, frequently wears a suit, speaks of integration [...]. He distances himself from Salafism and extremism, even actively participates in actions and projects against extremism, and often shows civil courage.’ (p. 99) In other words: the danger lies not in the Salafist with the scruffy beard, but the Muslim pediatrician in a suit running for a seat on the integration council. What is the goal of such sweeping suspicion, which can easily lead to conspiracy theories? And does it not already do so here, when K. immediately follows up with the warning that Political Islam seeks world domination (p. 101)?”

In response, Mouhanad Khorchide rejected the accusations, writing: “While reading his ‘review’, I frequently asked myself whether we are even talking about the same book, because his ‘review’ is a collection of personal attacks, blanket condemnations, and professional as well as factual falsehoods that I would like to refute here. He summarizes precisely what the book does not aim to say—and what it actually opposes.” In a review for the Frankfurter Allgemeine Zeitung (FAZ), Islamic studies scholar Alexander Flores, professor at the University of Applied Sciences Bremen, wrote about Gottes falsche Anwälte:

“It becomes troubling when one claims their own interpretation to be the only possible one, and declares all deviations from it to be falsification, manipulation, and betrayal, as is the case here. [...] He remains entirely on the ideological level and does not engage with the hard facts of Muslim existence, past and present. Unfortunately, this diminishes the persuasiveness of his sermon, which—based on its content and intended direction—is otherwise highly commendable.”

Similar to Thomas Bauer, political scientist Imad Mustafa also commented on Khorchide’s statements about “Political Islam,” describing them as conspiracy theories. He noted that their structure reminded him of anti-Semitic narratives about “world Jewry,” which portray the group as deceitful, deceptive, and disloyal.

In a witness examination related to Operation Luxor, Mouhanad Khorchide accused political scientist Farid Hafez of defamation. The background was a media report in which Hafez allegedly referred to Khorchide, Lorenzo Vidino, and Susanne Schröter as “far-right figures.” Khorchide told officials from the Directorate State Protection and Intelligence Service that the statement had significantly restricted his freedom of movement in the Arab world and that he and his family were now facing the consequences. Farid Hafez rejected the accusation, stating that, on the contrary, Khorchide maintained close ties to authoritarian states in the Arab world. As an example, Hafez cited an interview Khorchide gave to Amr Adib, a well-known propagandist for the Egyptian military regime, regarding Operation Luxor. Adib is known for repeated antisemitic remarks and a campaign against human rights activist Alaa Abd el-Fattah. In the interview, Khorchide allegedly made false claims, including that 25 million Euro in cash had been found during the raids, that the ideas of the Muslim Brotherhood were responsible for the 2020 Vienna terrorist attack, that the Austrian government was planning a ban on the Muslim Brotherhood, and that Muslim Brotherhood members pursued a strategy of taqiya. Furthermore, in 2019, Khorchide attended the opening of the “International Academy for the Training of Imams” together with Egyptian Minister of Religious Affairs Mokhtar Guma. He also explicitly praised Saudi Arabia, the United Arab Emirates, and Egypt for their efforts in combating “Political Islam.” Hafez criticized that Khorchide ignored the fact that the primary goal of these states was the suppression of any opposition. In line with this, Khorchide allegedly reinterpreted the 2013 military coup in Egypt as a “removal with broad public support.” The criticism of Khorchide’s proximity to the Egyptian military regime grew to such an extent that the University of Münster published an official statement from Khorchide in its university newsletter asserting that he was not collaborating with the Egyptian regime.

In 2020, Islamic studies scholar Muhammad Sameer Murtaza voiced strong criticism of the working definition of Political Islam developed by Mouhanad Khorchide for the Documentation Centre for Political Islam. Murtaza argued that the definition blurred the line between religion and state. He described Khorchide, due to his socialization in Saudi Arabia, as a Muslim with a “politically conservative, state-oriented mindset” whose work served the interests of right-wing populists and extremists. Additionally, Murtaza accused Khorchide of having flattered a high-ranking Egyptian official in 2016 who represents an authoritarian and anti-human rights regime. He also cited appearances by Khorchide that were strongly criticized by the Iranian opposition, including at the Iranian Embassy in Germany (2010), the Islamic Centre Hamburg (2017), and an event featuring Alireza Panahian, who publicly advocates for the execution of Iranian dissidents.

== See also ==
- Islam in Germany

== Works ==
- Islam is Mercy: Essential Features of a Modern Religion 2014. ISBN 978-3-451-80286-7.
  - German: Islam ist Barmherzigkeit. Grundzüge einer modernen Religion 2012.
- Scharia – der missverstandene Gott: Der Weg zu einer modernen islamischen Ethik 2013.
- Gott glaubt an den Menschen: Mit dem Islam zu einem neuen Humanismus 2015.

As editor:

- with Klaus von Stosch: Herausforderungen an die islamische Theologie in Europa. Challenges for Islamic theology in Europe 2012.
- with Marco Schöller: Das Verhältnis zwischen Islamwissenschaft und islamischer Theologie. Beiträge der Konferenz Münster, 1.-2. Juli 2011 2012.
