= Stephanie Krisper =

Austrian lawyer and politician

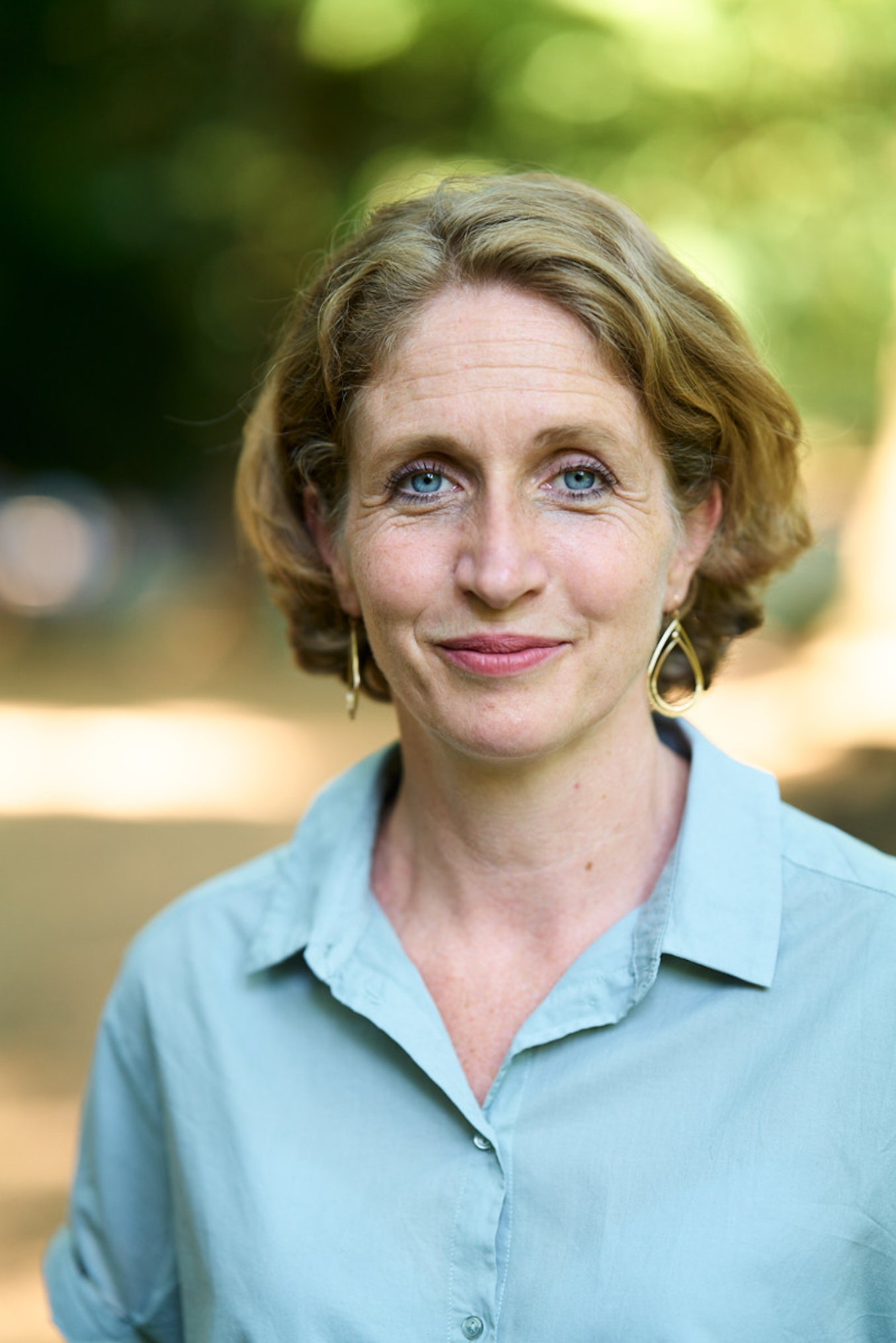

Member of the National Council
- In office 2017–2025
- Succeeded by: Lisa Aldali

Personal details
- Born: 24 May 1980 (age 46) Vienna, Austria
- Party: NEOS

Stephanie Krisper (born 24 May 1980 in Vienna) is an Austrian lawyer and former politician (NEOS). Krisper worked as a human rights expert for the Ludwig Boltzmann Institute for Human Rights in Vienna. From November 2017 to October 2025, she was a member of the Austrian parliament. Krisper was her party's parliamentary group leader in several parliamentary committees of inquiry that investigated political scandals, including the search of the BVT, the ‘Ibiza affair’ and political corruption scandals.

== Education and professional career ==
Stephanie Krisper attended the St. Ursula Gymnasium in Vienna, where she graduated with honours in 1998. She then began studying law at the Faculty of Law of the University of Vienna in September 1998. She completed her studies in March 2003 with a Magistra iuris (Mag. iur.) degree. In the meantime, she spent an Erasmus year at the Panthéon-Assas University in Paris from September 2001 to June 2002. From 2003 to 2004, Stephanie Krisper completed a postgraduate master's degree at the European Centre for Human Rights and Democratisation in Venice and Maastricht, obtaining a European Master in Human Rights and Democratisation (E.MA).

From September 2007 to June 2012, Krisper also completed her doctoral studies in law at the University of Vienna, where she ultimately earned her doctorate in law (Dr. iur.) with a dissertation on ‘The European Union's Safe Country Concepts versus the Principle of Non-Refoulement.’

In addition to a series of legal internships at a law firm and human rights NGOs (focusing on advocacy, legal advice for asylum seekers etc.), Krisper worked for the Federal Ministry of Foreign Affairs in its human rights department at the Permanent Mission of Austria to the United Nations in Geneva, at the UN High Commissioner for Refugees, and at the Delegation of the European Commission to the United Nations in Geneva and New York. In 2007, she worked for the NGO Danish Refugee Council in Sri Lanka as an emergency protection officer. From January 2009 until her swearing-in to the Austrian Parliament in November 2017, Stephanie Krisper worked as a human rights expert focusing on torture prevention at the Ludwig Boltzmann Institute for Human Rights in Vienna, where she worked in particular for commissions of the Human Rights Council and the Ombudsman Board as National Mechanism for the Prevention of Torture. Finally, she was significantly involved in the preparation of the new edition of Manfred Nowak's commentary on the United Nations Convention against Torture (Oxford University Press).

== Political career ==
=== Candidacies and mandates ===
Stephanie Krisper has been a member of the NEOS – Das Neue Österreich (New Austria Engaged) party since 2012. After running in the party's internal primaries for a place on the list for the 2017 National Parliament election, she was elected to 13^{th} place on the NEOS federal list and third place on the NEOS state list for Vienna. As the party ultimately won two basic mandates in the Vienna state constituency and the first-placed candidate, Beate Meinl-Reisinger, relinquished her mandate in order to continue serving in the Vienna State Parliament and Municipal Council, Krisper moved up to the second basic mandate. She was sworn in as a member of the National Parliament for the first time on 9 November 2017. After the 2019 National Parliament election, Krisper remained in the National Parliament, returning to it via a basic mandate in the Vienna state constituency. Even after the 2024 National Parliament election, Krisper remained a member of parliament, now in second place on the NEOS federal list.

On 10 October 2025, she announced that she would be stepping down from her position as a member of the National Parliament at the end of October 2025. Lisa Aldali took her place.

=== Work in investigative committees ===
In the parliamentary ‘Investigative Committee on Political Influence on the Federal Office for the Protection of the Constitution and Counterterrorism (BVT Investigative Committee)’ in the „BVT Affair“, which was established in April 2018 and concluded its hearing of evidence in September 2019, she was the leader of her party's parliamentary group. In November 2019, it became known that, as part of the BVT affair, the Federal Office for the Prevention and Combating of Corruption attempted to seize Krisper's mobile phone on 10 May 2019 in order to identify her informants. The device belonging to Die Presse journalist Anna Thalhammer was also to be confiscated. The Vienna Public Prosecutor's Office rejected these requests at the beginning of July.

Krisper was also the parliamentary group leader of her party in the ‘Investigation Committee on the Alleged Corruptibility of the Turquoise-Blue Federal Government (Ibiza Investigation Committee)’, which was established in January 2020 and concluded its hearing of evidence in July 2021. The same applies to the parliamentary committee investigating allegations of corruption against members of the ÖVP government (ÖVP Corruption Investigation Committee), that was established on 9 December 2021 and ended on 23 October 2024.

Krisper was honoured in the media as a ‘whistleblower’ for her parliamentary work.

In the Austrian documentary ‘Projekt Ballhausplatz’ (subtitle: ‘The Rise and Fall of Sebastian Kurz’) from 2023 by director Kurt Langbein, Krisper analyses the power structures of the turquoise ÖVP and the mechanisms of political corruption in Austria. The film deals with the political career of former Chancellor Sebastian Kurz – from his rapid rise to his resignation as a result of the Ibiza Affair and the ÖVP corruption scandal.

In addition to shedding light on the various forms of corruption in Austrian politics (media corruption, public corruption, etc.), Krisper considered it a success of the last investigative committee to show that the Public Prosecutor's Office for Economic Affairs and Corruption (WKStA) cannot work effectively because it lacks resources and is additionally hampered by political pressure. Unfortunately, reforms against corruption were almost entirely absent, but in her opinion, the last committee helped to ‘relieve some of the pressure on the WKStA, enabling it to investigate efficiently; as a consequence, Sebastian Kurz had to step aside and then resign’.

== Other topics ==
=== Austrian Gambling Legislation ===
Even before the ‘Ibiza affair’, Stephanie Krisper was campaigning in the National Parliament for a reform of the Austrian Gambling Act. As the initiator of several parliamentary motions, she called for, among other things, the creation of an independent gambling supervisory authority free from external influence in order to eliminate the existing conflicts of interest in the Ministry of Finance, which is simultaneously a casino owner, regulator and licensor. Her work focused on an Austria-wide blocking database for gamblers, the protection of gambling addicts and the consistent fight against illegal online providers through stricter legal measures and IP blocking.

=== Asylum and migration policy ===
As spokesperson for asylum and migration, Krisper advocated in the National Parliament for a fact-based asylum and migration policy that focuses on the protection of refugees while upholding the principles of the rule of law. She repeatedly criticised false or misleading figures in the public debate and emphasised how important it is for politicians and the media to work with reliable data in order to avoid vague fears and prejudices. She called for fair and swift asylum procedures that ensure legal certainty and, at the same time, guarantee humane living conditions. Krisper advocated European solutions to finally remedy abuses at the EU's external borders, such as the inhumane conditions in Greek refugee camps, and to strengthen solidarity within the EU. In doing so, she called for a policy that both fulfils humanitarian obligations and provides the necessary instruments for effective migration management.

=== Russian espionage ===
In close coordination with investigative journalist Erich Möchel, Krisper held background discussions with the media to publicise the technical methods used by Russian intelligence services – in particular digital and satellite-based espionage by diplomatic missions in Vienna – through media reports. She submitted inquiries to the federal government regarding the number of Russian diplomats and suspected agents, as well as measures against hybrid threats from the Russian Federation. Krisper repeatedly criticised Austria's negligence in expulsions, sanctions and security measures.

=== Wirecard affair ===
Stephanie Krisper supported national and international investigations. This became known, for example, in connection with the Wirecard affair surrounding Jan Marsalek and its Austrian links. Through inquiries, Krisper sought to shed light on how deep Marsalek's network reached into Austrian security agencies and what role FPÖ politicians played in passing on intelligence information. She repeatedly criticised the lack of efficiency in the investigations and the opaque connections between former government employees, Wirecard and Russian intelligence services.

In the international documentary ‘Scandal! Bringing Down Wirecard’ (2022), released on Netflix, which sheds light on the massive accounting scandal surrounding Jan Marsalek and CEO Markus Braun and the rise and fall of payment service provider Wirecard, Krisper is seen as a mediator of relevant sources of information to the Financial Times.

=== Exercising her free mandate ===
On two occasions, she exercised her free mandate and did not vote with her parliamentary group.

=== Compulsory vaccination ===
On 20 January 2022, Stephanie Krisper, along with 32 other members of the National Parliament, voted against the bill to introduce compulsory COVID-19 vaccination in Austria, arguing that she saw compulsory vaccination as only a modest contribution to the vaccination coverage rate, which would not justify the disproportionate interference with individual rights that it would entail. Johannes Margreiter, Fiona Fiedler and Gerald Loacker from the NEOS club also voted against the bill. However, it was passed by a majority of the National Parliament members.

=== Surveillance of dangerous individuals and messenger services ===
On 9 July 2025, the National Parliament voted by a majority of ÖVP, SPÖ and parts of NEOS in favour of introducing so-called messenger or dangerous individual surveillance, which allows encrypted communications to be read. Stephanie Krisper voted against this draft law together with her colleague Nikolaus Scherak. During the debate, Krisper accused the proposal of not making us ‘any safer’ but remaining highly problematic in terms of its concrete implementation, especially with regard to proportionality and constitutionality.

=== Resignation from the National Parliament ===
On 9 October 2025, Krisper announced her resignation as a member of the National Parliament at the end of October 2025. She said that her sphere of influence had been ‘so reduced’ by her participation in the government that she ‘no longer saw any point in parliamentary activity’. As an example, she cited the NEOS's stance on stopping family reunification for asylum seekers and on messenger surveillance. Furthermore, she said there was a ‘conflict of loyalty’ between her convictions and the NEOS party line since it entered government.

Krisper emphasised that compromises were necessary in a coalition, but that the concessions were too great when it came to the issues close to her heart. She said she missed the ‘courage to present a clear alternative to the FPÖ’. After almost eight years in parliament, she wants to ‘work for human rights and against corruption from an independent position’ in the future. She will remain a member of the NEOS party and on its extended executive committee.

In her farewell speech in the National Parliament on 14 October 2025, Krisper thanked those who had supported her in her work as a member of parliament: staff of the parliamentary club, the parliament and representatives of her own and other parties except the ÖVP. She also expressed her appreciation for the Third President of the National Parliament, Doris Bures. After her speech, she received a standing ovation.

== Personal life ==
Stephanie Krisper is the mother of three children and lives in Vienna.

== Links ==
- Curriculum Vitae Stephanie Krisper
- Dr. Stephanie Krisper
- Contribution to the 2nd edition of Manfred Nowak's United Nations Convention against Torture – A Commentary, Oxford University Press
