= 2025 Villach stabbing attack =

Mass stabbing in Villach, Austria

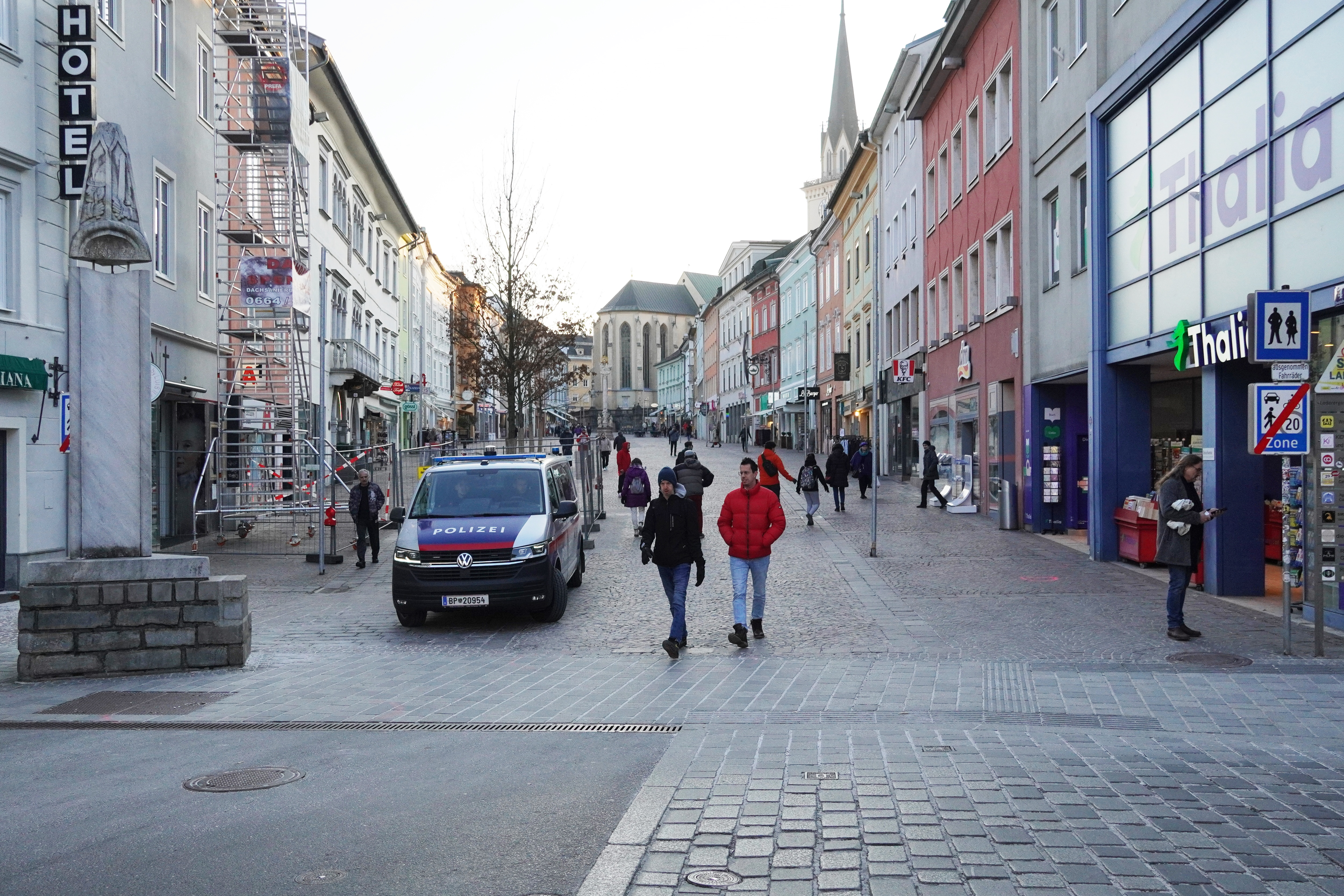
- A police car at the scene of the attack
- Location: Villach, Austria
- Date: 15 February 2025; 20 months ago 15:33 – c. 15:40 (CET; UTC+01:00)
- Attack type: Mass stabbing
- Weapon: Pocketknife
- Deaths: 1
- Injuries: 6 (including the perpetrator)
- Victim: Alexander Kopeinig
- Perpetrator: Ahmad G.
- Defender: Alaaeddin Alhalabi
- Motive: Islamic extremism
- Convictions: One count of murder, five counts of attempted murder, one count of terrorist association and criminal organization

On 15 February 2025, a mass stabbing occurred in Villach, Carinthia, Austria. A 14-year-old boy was killed and five others were injured before a passing motorist disrupted the attack by ramming the perpetrator, a 23-year-old Syrian man, who was subsequently arrested by police.

An investigation has classified the stabbing as an Islamist terrorist incident. The perpetrator was found to have been inspired by the Islamic State. He was sentenced to life imprisonment in May 2026.

== Attack ==
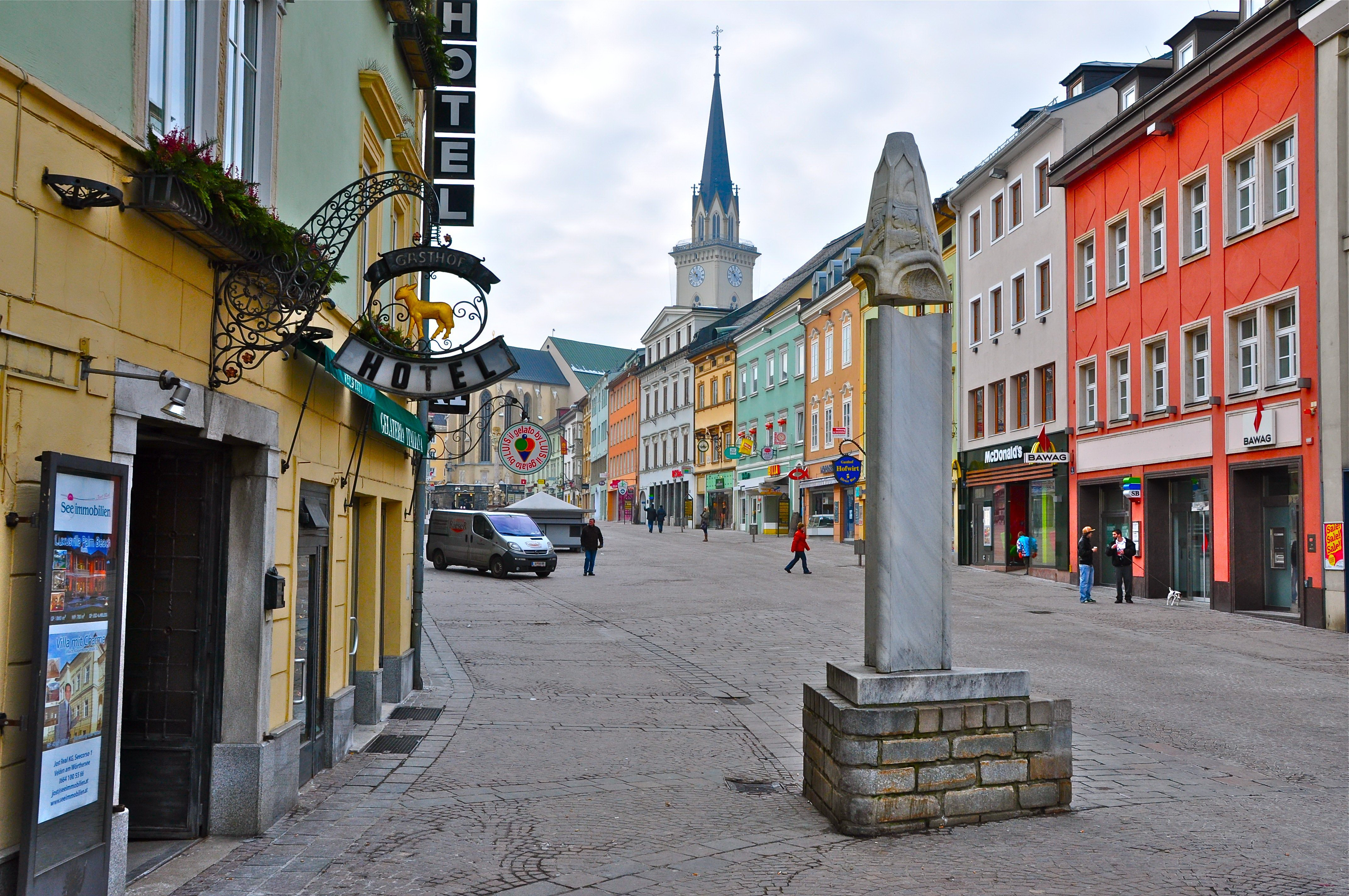
Main square where the attack occurred

The attack took place at 15:33 on the Hauptplatz pedestrian zone, located in the historic city center of Villach. A man began randomly stabbing pedestrians using a knife.

The attack was disrupted by the intervention of 42-year-old Alaaeddin Alhalabi, a Syrian food delivery worker, who had seen two of the injured while driving past the scene and proceeded to ram the perpetrator, standing around three metres away, with his VW car. The perpetrator was thrown back several metres, losing his knife and being lightly injured. Alhalabi had intended to get out of his car and hold the perpetrator down, but bystanders began hitting the car, believing it to be another part of the attack. Alhalabi instead drove away and called police. Alhalabi's intervention was later credited by police spokesperson Rainer Dionisio as helping to limit the scope of the attack.

The perpetrator got up from the ground shortly after, but did not continue the attack and sat down on a bench instead. Police arrived to arrest the perpetrator seven minutes after the first emergency call was placed. Bystanders, who included a nurse, rendered first aid on some of the injured during this time.

== Victims ==
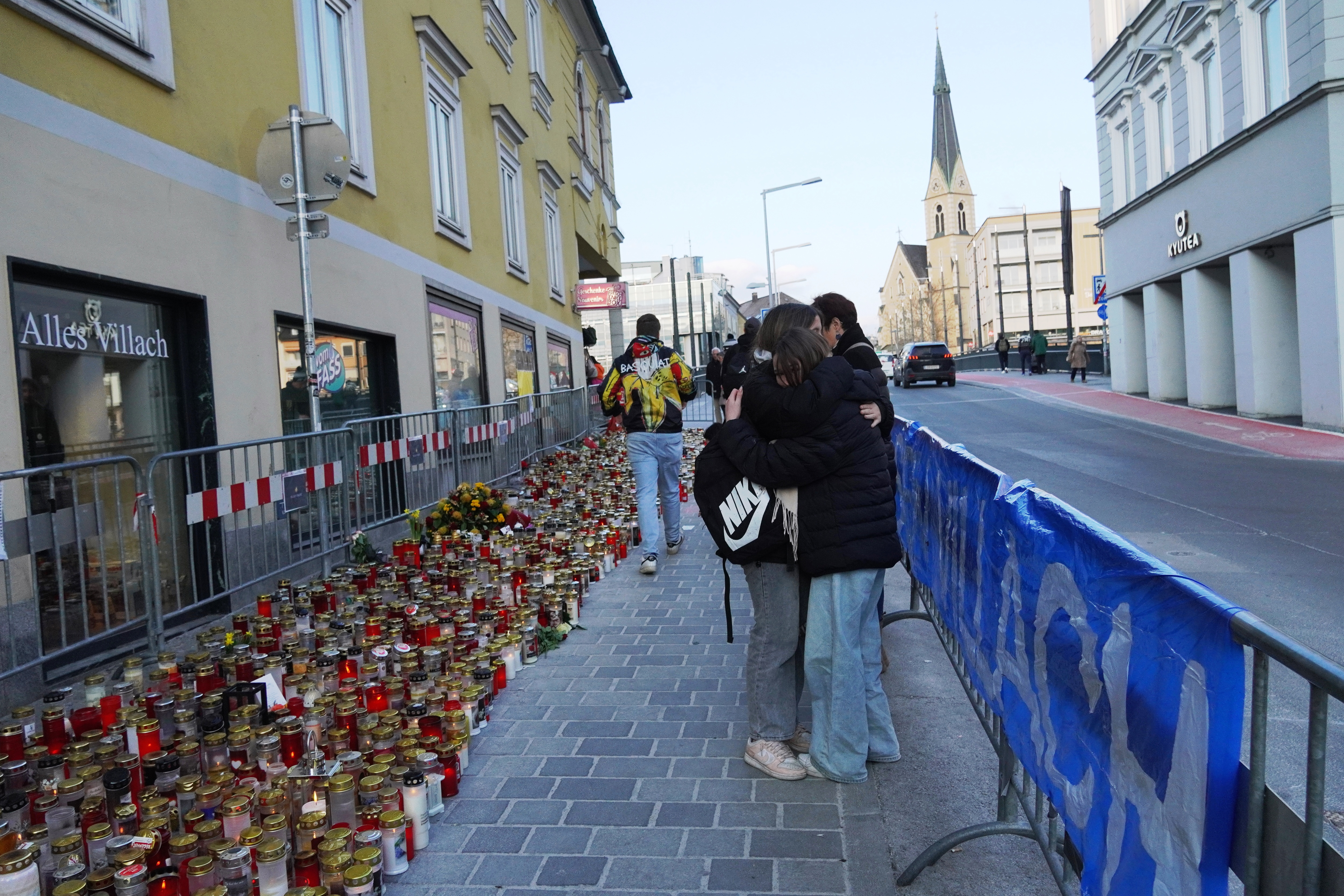
A memorial set up near the scene

14-year-old Alexander Kopeinig was killed while five other people, aged 15 to 36, all male, were injured. All had been stabbed in the chest and abdomen. Three were treated in intensive care, with a 32-year-old released and two 15-year-olds stabilised by 18 February. The eldest of the injured was a Turkish national who was first misidentifed as Iraqi.

== Perpetrator ==
The perpetrator was 23-year-old Ahmad G. originally from Syria. He came to Austria at age 18, in either 2019 or 2020, after being denied entry into Germany, where other family members lived. In September 2020, Bavarian Police in Traunstein made a personal check on G. while on a train from Salzburg, during which he provided a fake Spanish identification card. Laufen Court sentenced him to a €700 fine, which he didn't pay, leading to a national arrest warrant on illegal entry and forgery charges in February 2021. Also in September 2020, he filed for asylum in Vienna, citing fears of conscription into the Syrian Arab Armed Forces. Ahmad G. received asylum in 2021 and held legal residency status in Austria at the time of the attack, living in a flat in Villach with two roommates. He had no prior criminal record in Austria, but on 12 April 2024, he was arrested by German authorities in Erfurt for the lapsed fine. He served three days at two jails in Thuringia before being released upon paying the fine.

== Investigation ==
According to witnesses and responding officers, the perpetrator shouted "Allahu Akbar" and later mocked police who came to apprehend him. An image just before the arrest, in which G. is seen laughing and showing a raised index finger (representing Tawhid), was widely shared online.

In the immediate aftermath, police spokesperson Rainer Dionisio, speaking to Austria's public broadcaster ORF, indicated that investigators had not yet determined if the motive was Islamic extremism and whether the perpetrator had acted alone, the latter due to reports of a second attacker. A day after the attack at a conference in Villach, the interior minister Gerhard Karner said that the perpetrator was influenced by an Islamic extremist motive and was linked to the Islamic State, but there were no signs of an accomplice.

The weapon used in the attack, a 10-cm foldable pocketknife, had been purchased online three days earlier, which police considered proof that the attack was planned in advance. A search of Ahmad G.'s flat had yielded a self-made Islamic State flag, a written oath of allegiance to ISIS, as well as a video made the day of the attack, in which he again pledged loyalty to ISIS, saying he intended to be shot by police after the attack. G. had not made direct contact with the terror group itself.

According to G.'s confession, he had intended to kill as many people as possible in the attack. Ahmad G. said he was radicalised through TikTok and YouTube over the course of three months. He was also active on Telegram and streamed several videos containing jihadist propaganda.

Ahmad G. has been held on charges of murder and attempted murder in relation to terrorism, under maximum security at a jail in Klagenfurt, where he remained as of December 2025. Multiple psychiatric assessments determined that Ahmad G. was mentally competent. An investigation found that G. had travelled to Erbil, Iraq, to visit relatives in September 2024, though there was no evidence of him interacting with potential accomplices during the 20-day stay. In December 2025, it was announced that the investigation ruled out the involvement of others in the planning and commission of the stabbing. The same month, G. was officially charged by the prosecutor's office of Klagenfurt. The final charges amounted to one count of murder and five counts of attempted murder, as well as one count of terrorist association and criminal organization. According to the prosecution, the motive behind the attack was to intimidate the public in accordance with the ideology of the Islamic State.

The trial took place at Landesgericht Klagefurt, with court dates planned for 27 and 28 May 2026. Ahmad G. affirmed his allegiance to the Islamic State and stated that he had committed the knife attack after failing to obtain explosives for a suicide bombing. The trial ended early on 27 May, when the defendant was found guilty of all charges and sentenced to life imprisonment. The verdict was finalised on 2 June, after another psychiatric exam determined that Ahmad G. was fit to serve his sentence at a regular prison.

== Aftermath ==
The first carnival event for the year by Villach's carnival guild, originally set for the day after the attack, was cancelled. The guild initially made a television statement that the carnival would be held in full at a later date, albeit with a different route for the parade as it usually passed through the Hauptplatz; all related events were cancelled due to security concerns. The carnival guild filed with Landesgericht Kärnten for private party inclusion in the criminal case against Ahmad G. to seek damages for incurred financial losses, but the motion was rejected on 27 January 2026.

On 18 February, a memorial service, attended by 4,000 people, was held at the Nikolai Church, followed by a memorial march to the Draubrücke, near the square where the stabbings took place. At 18:00 on the same day, the church's bells were rung for four minutes. Villach maintained a week of mourning, which ended with a ceremony at the Draubrücke, near the attack site.

Misinformation was spread in relation to the attack, such as a video of an axe attack falsely captioned as depicting the stabbing in Villach and the made-up claim that 17 Syrian nationals were secretly wanted by police in relation to the attack. In March 2025, social media users falsely shared that the mother of the sole fatality had died by suicide.

Alaaeddin Alhalabi was widely credited with stopping the attack and gave interviews to ORF, Kronen Zeitung, and various German news agencies. To Kronen, he voiced a fear of retaliation for his actions. Within four days, he received several death threats from radical Islamists via Facebook, following the widespread broadcast of a filmed interview with Reuters through Al Jazeera und Al Arabiya. On 20 February, Alhalabi and his family were put under police protection by order of the Directorate State Protection and Intelligence Service, not leaving their house for two weeks, with Alhalabi receiving psychological counselling by the Red Cross. At the time, Alhalabi was still under investigation for assault for ramming the perpetrator with his car, but prosecutors emphasised that this was a formal process and largely related to crime scene reconstruction. In March 2025, he received an honorary gold coin along with a letter by the newly appointed chancellor Christian Stocker. In October 2025, Alhalabi was awarded a Ferdinand Berger Prize for civic engagement, which was preceded by a minute of silence for the Villach stabbing at Alhalabi's request. In December 2025, Alhalabi was the recipient of the first Fahndung Österreich Prize for civil courage and two gold coins in a live ceremony broadcast on ServusTV, which was presented by the Criminal Intelligence Service Austria and the newspaper Kurier.

== See also ==
- 2025 Graz school shooting
- 2025 Munich car attack
- 2024 Vienna terrorism plot
- 2020 Vienna attack
- 2015 Graz car attack
