= Jörg Leichtfried =

Austrian politician

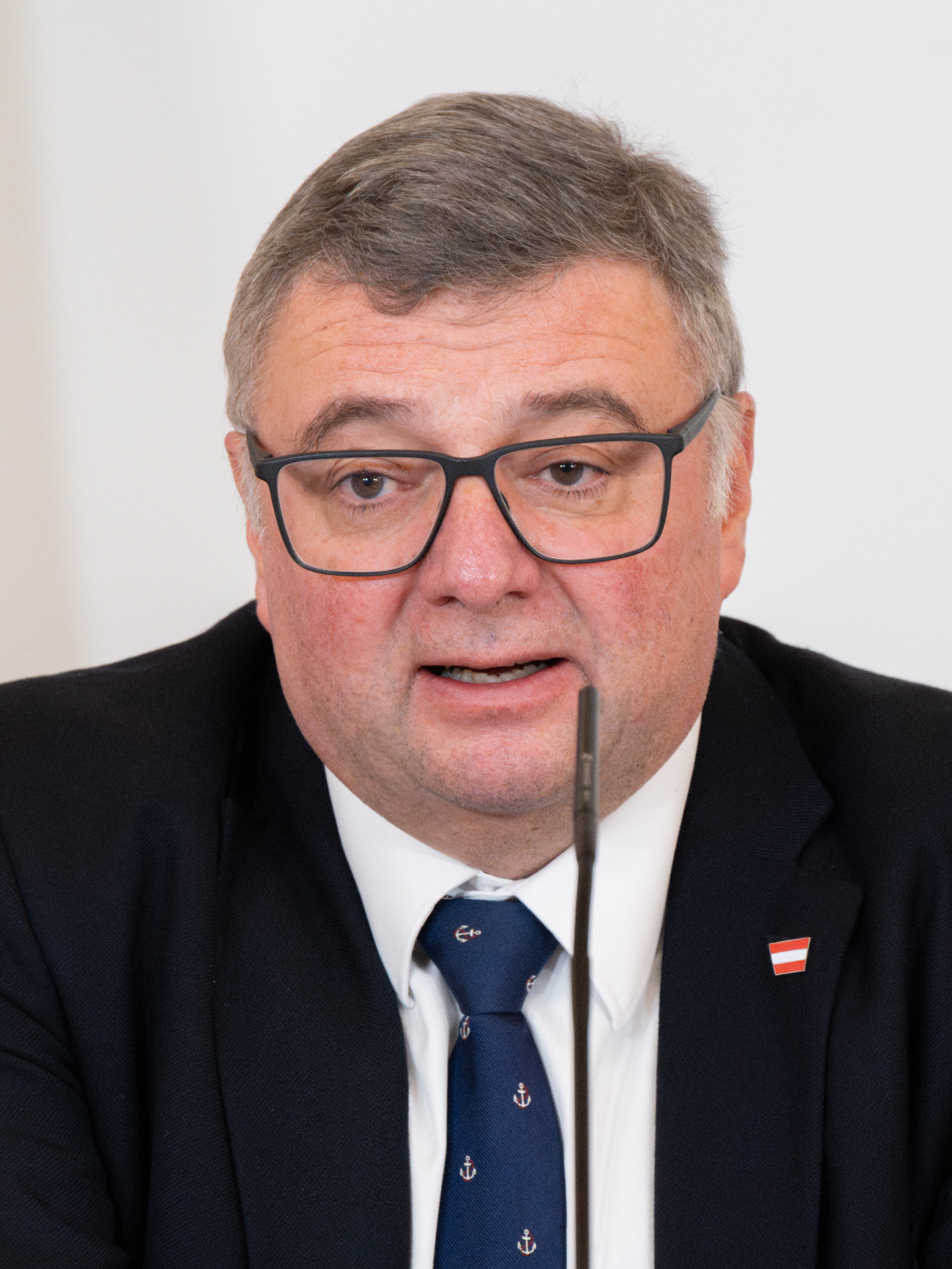

State Secretary at the Federal Ministry of the Interior
- Incumbent
- Assumed office 3 March 2025
- Chancellor: Christian Stocker
- Minister: Gerhard Karner

Minister of Transport, Innovation and Technology
- In office 18 May 2016 – 18 December 2017
- Chancellor: Christian Kern
- Preceded by: Gerald Klug
- Succeeded by: Norbert Hofer

Councilor for Transport, Innovation and Technology of Styria
- In office 23 June 2015 – 18 May 2016
- Governor: Franz Voves
- Preceded by: Gerhard Kurzmann
- Succeeded by: Anton Lang

Member of the European Parliament
- In office 13 June 2004 – 23 June 2015
- Constituency: Austria

Personal details
- Born: 18 June 1967 (age 58) Bruck an der Mur, Austria
- Party: Social Democratic Party of Austria; Party of European Socialists

Jörg Leichtfried (born 18 June 1967 in Bruck an der Mur, Styria) is an Austrian politician of the Social Democratic Party who has been serving as a member of the National Council since the 2017 elections. Since 3 March 2025 he is the State Secretary at the Federal Ministry of the Interior responsible for the Directorate State Protection and Intelligence Service (DSN).

He previously served as Minister of Transport, Innovation and Technology in the government of Chancellor Christian Kern from 2016 until 2017.

== Education ==
- Studied jurisprudence at the Faculty of Law of the University of Graz (graduated 1994)

== Career ==
- 1995-1999: Legal officer, Styrian Chamber of Labour
- 1998-2004: Departmental head, citizens' advice service, Bruck and der Mur's City council

== Political career ==
=== Early beginnings ===
- 1994-2000: Regional vice-chairman of the Styria Young Socialists
- 1999: Austrian Parliament candidate, Styria Young Socialists
- 2000-2002: Federal chairman of the Austrian Young Socialists
- since 2000: Regional Party vice-chairman of the Styria SPÖ

=== Member of the European Parliament, 2004–2015 ===
Leichtfried was first elected a Member of the European Parliament (MEP) with the SPÖ, part of the Socialist Group, in the 2004 European elections. During his time in parliament, he served on the European Parliament's Committee on Transport and Tourism. In this capacity, he was the Parliament's rapporteur on the European Aviation Safety Agency (2007) and on the cross-border admission of heavy haulers (2014), among other dossiers.

In addition, Leichtfried was a substitute for the Committee on International Trade, a member of the Delegation for relations with the countries of the Andean Community and a substitute for the Delegation for relations with the countries of Central America. He was also a member of the European Parliament Intergroup on the Welfare and Conservation of Animals and of the European Parliament Intergroup on the Digital Agenda.

=== Federal Minister of Transport, 2016–2017 ===
In May 2016, incoming Chancellor Christian Kern appointed Leichtfried as Federal Minister for Transport, Innovation and Technology.

Under his leadership, Austria announced plans in March 2017 to file a legal challenge at the European Court of Justice against plans by Germany to introduce a road toll for foreign-registered cars using German highways.

=== State Secretary at the Federal Ministry of the Interior, 2025– ===
On 3 March 2025 Leichtfried was appointed as State Secretary at the Ministry of the Interior. The Federal Minister of the Interior, Gerhard Karner, assigned him responsibility for the Directorate State Protection and Intelligence Service (DSN).
