= 2018 Raid of Austria's Federal Office for the Protection of the Constitution and Counterterrorism (BVT) =

BVT Raid
- Date: February 28, 2018
- Location: BVT Headquarters and private residences, Austria
- Type: Police raid, intelligence agency search
- Perpetrators: Austrian Federal Police, under direction of anti-corruption prosecutors. Alleged involvement: FPÖ (Herbert Kickl), Jan Marsalek (GRU).
- Outcome: Suspension of BVT Director and officers (mostly overturned); Seizure of sensitive data; Loss of trust from international intelligence partners; Parliamentary inquiry; Legal challenges; Dissolution of BVT and creation of DSN

The BVT Raid refers to a police operation conducted on February 28, 2018, at the headquarters of Austria's then-domestic intelligence agency, the Bundesamt für Verfassungsschutz und Terrorismusbekämpfung (BVT), and the private residences of several of its employees. The raid, officially part of an anti-corruption investigation, led to the seizure of sensitive data, the suspension of key personnel (including BVT Director Peter Gridling), and sparked a major political and security crisis in Austria. The event ultimately contributed to the BVT's dissolution in 2021 and its replacement by the Directorate State Protection and Intelligence Service (DSN).

== Introduction ==
The Federal Office for the Protection of the Constitution and Counterterrorism (BVT) was Austria's domestic intelligence agency, established in 2002. Its primary mandate was to protect the constitutional bodies of Austria and their ability to function, and to counter terrorism and extremism. The BVT was under the Directorate General for Public Security, part of the Federal Ministry of the Interior. The BVT published an annual report, the Verfassungsschutzbericht, detailing the state of constitutional protection. Following controversies and criticisms, especially after the 2020 Vienna terror attack, the BVT was dissolved in late 2021 and replaced by the DSN.

A pivotal event leading to the BVT's dissolution was the raid on February 28, 2018. The Austrian Federal Police, acting on an anti-corruption investigation by prosecutors, conducted the raid. Sensitive data on far-right groups, some with connections to the Freedom Party of Austria (FPÖ), was seized. Peter Gridling, the BVT director, was suspended. The timing of the raid, given the political context, raised immediate questions about potential political motivations.

== Background ==
Austria's political landscape in early 2018 was defined by a coalition government of the center-right Austrian People's Party (ÖVP) and the far-right FPÖ. Sebastian Kurz (ÖVP) was Chancellor, and Herbert Kickl (FPÖ) was Minister of the Interior. The FPÖ has historically been associated with nationalist and xenophobic ideologies, and concerns about its links to far-right extremism were common.

The FPÖ's role in government placed Herbert Kickl in control of the ministry overseeing the BVT. This was significant given concerns about the FPÖ's relationship with Russia. The party's alleged pro-Russian leanings, combined with its authority over Austria's intelligence agency, created a complex backdrop for the raid. This context suggested possible external influences or internal political maneuvering.

== Raid on February 28, 2018 ==
The operation on February 28, 2018, saw Austrian Federal Police executing search warrants at the BVT headquarters and employee residences, acting under the instructions of anti-corruption prosecutors. Sensitive data, including information on far-right extremist groups, was confiscated. The police unit used was a task force usually focused on street crime, reportedly led by an officer with FPÖ affiliations. This choice of personnel, lacking experience in intelligence operations, drew criticism, as did alleged failures to follow protocols for handling classified information. Following the raid, BVT head Peter Gridling and other officers were suspended. The inexperienced police unit and disregard for classified information procedures suggested a potential intent beyond a standard anti-corruption investigation, possibly aimed at disruption and accessing specific intelligence.

Initial media reactions reported the event and suspensions. Some media outlets questioned the proportionality of the police action and hinted at underlying political motivations. Reports also emerged of a potential power struggle between the ÖVP and the FPÖ over control of Austria's intelligence services. This early coverage indicated the controversial nature of the raid and suspicion of political interference.

== Alleged reasons and motivations ==
The official reason for the raid was an ongoing investigation into alleged corruption and mishandling of sensitive data within the BVT. The investigation was reportedly based on anonymous allegations. While anti-corruption was the formal justification, reliance on unsubstantiated claims raised doubts about the true nature of the investigation and potential misuse for other purposes.

A significant counter-narrative was the allegation of political interference by the FPÖ, led by then-Interior Minister Herbert Kickl. It was suggested that the FPÖ aimed to discredit the BVT and restructure it with loyal individuals, gaining control over the intelligence apparatus and its sensitive information. A key aspect was the targeting of the BVT unit investigating right-wing extremism, which included groups connected to the FPÖ. The evidence for political interference by the FPÖ suggested a potential abuse of power, threatening the intelligence agency's independence.

Reports also suggested a potential role of Russian influence. A Russian agent, Jan Marsalek, allegedly manipulated the FPÖ with false information, leading to the raid. This involved an anonymous dossier alleging BVT misconduct, used to instigate the investigation. The alleged intention was for the Kremlin to rebuild the Austrian intelligence service under leadership more favorable to Moscow. The BVT was reportedly compromised by Russian agents to the extent that it was temporarily suspended from European intelligence sharing. The possibility of Russian involvement introduced a geopolitical dimension, raising concerns about foreign interference in Austria's domestic affairs and national security.

== Key individuals involved ==
- Herbert Kickl: FPÖ leader and Minister of the Interior at the time, with authority over the BVT. Allegedly ordered the raid, though he denied wrongdoing. His actions led to a parliamentary inquiry.
- Peter Gridling: Director of the BVT during the raid. Suspended from his position immediately after. His suspension signified the immediate disruption of BVT leadership.
- Jan Marsalek: Austrian citizen reportedly working for Russian military intelligence (GRU). Allegedly fed false information to the FPÖ, triggering the raid. Accused of promoting the anonymous dossier alleging BVT misconduct. His alleged involvement highlighted potential foreign manipulation.
- Peter Goldgruber: General Secretary of the Interior under Kickl. Reportedly encouraged the prosecutor to investigate BVT leadership based on Marsalek's dossier. Goldgruber's actions supported allegations of political interference.

== Aftermath ==
Immediate consequences included the suspension of Director Peter Gridling and several BVT officers. While most suspensions were later overturned by a court, the initial action created instability within the agency and likely hampered operations.

A substantial amount of sensitive information was seized, including the "Neptune Database," containing intelligence shared by foreign agencies. This raised concerns about data falling into the wrong hands or being leaked, compromising national security and international cooperation.

The most significant consequence was the loss of trust from international partners. Several foreign intelligence services reduced or ceased intelligence sharing with Austria. Austria was even temporarily excluded from significant European intelligence sharing. This isolation damaged Austria's reputation. The suspension of intelligence sharing was a major blow to Austria's security capabilities.

=== Legal and political investigations ===
The Austrian parliament established a committee of inquiry (Untersuchungsausschuss) to investigate possible politically motivated influence on the BVT. The inquiry found that senior officials in the Ministry of the Interior had actively pushed for the raid. It also revealed conflicts between figures in the Ministry of the Interior, the BVT, and the Ministry of Justice. The inquiry concluded that restructuring the BVT was necessary.

The legality of the raid was challenged in court. An Austrian court declared large parts of the house search unlawful, stating that the information could have been obtained through administrative assistance. Another court decision lifted most of the suspensions of BVT officers. These rulings undermined the official justification and reinforced the perception of an overreach of power, potentially politically motivated.

== Consequences ==
The long-term repercussions were profound. Following persistent criticism, particularly concerning perceived failures before the 2020 Vienna terror attack, the BVT was dissolved in late 2021. Its reputation had been severely tarnished. The dissolution can be seen as a direct consequence of the raid, which exposed vulnerabilities and damaged credibility.

The Austrian government established the State Security and Intelligence Directorate (DSN). This new agency was intended to address shortcomings through reforms to improve staffing, security protocols, and international cooperation. The DSN represented an effort to rebuild Austria's intelligence capabilities and regain trust.

Despite these efforts, concerns and challenges persisted. Mistrust from foreign intelligence partners remained, particularly regarding potential FPÖ influence. Questions also remained about Russian influence in Austrian politics and intelligence. These issues indicated that the consequences of the 2018 raid continued to affect Austria's security relationships and raised concerns about susceptibility to foreign interference.

== Reactions and analysis ==
The raid elicited strong reactions. Austrian political parties were deeply divided, with opposition parties accusing the governing coalition, especially the FPÖ, of orchestrating the raid to purge adversaries. The liberal Neos party criticized Herbert Kickl and the FPÖ, suggesting they knowingly acted in Russia's interests. Green Party lawmakers asserted the FPÖ's objective was to dismantle the BVT and establish a new agency with party loyalists. Even within the coalition, the ÖVP expressed concerns about Kickl's leadership and the FPÖ's alignment with Moscow. These reactions underscored the political fallout and divisions.

Internationally, the response from intelligence agencies was significant concern. Numerous foreign services curtailed or halted intelligence sharing with Austria. This reflected concerns about the security of shared information and potential compromise. German lawmakers suggested reconsidering intelligence cooperation if the FPÖ were to be part of a future government. The international reaction highlighted the breach of trust and detrimental impact.

Legal experts also weighed in, with Austrian courts ruling the raid largely illegal. Commentators criticized the proportionality and legality, further questioning the official narrative. The legal condemnation reinforced the perception of an overreach of power.

The media played a significant role. Reports covered the political dimensions and potential foreign influence, particularly from Russia. Some outlets expressed skepticism towards official explanations, contributing to public debate and scrutiny. Widespread media attention underscored the public interest and controversy.

== Impact on counter-terrorism ==
The raid likely had a detrimental impact on Austria's counter-terrorism efforts. The operation targeted the unit responsible for investigating right-wing extremism. Seizure of sensitive information could have compromised ongoing investigations and disrupted intelligence gathering. Suspension of key personnel undoubtedly affected the agency's ability to function effectively.

Prior to the raid, the BVT was already monitoring right-wing extremist activities. The annual Verfassungsschutzbericht documented incidents. Given the FPÖ's history of criticism regarding ties to neo-Nazism and far-right extremism, targeting the BVT's unit suggested a potential motive to undermine investigations.

The subsequent terror attack in Vienna in November 2020 led to criticism of the BVT. Some argued that BVT resources were diverted due to the aftermath of the 2018 raid and "Operation Luxor," potentially hindering effective monitoring. This event underscored the potential real-world consequences of the disruption and damage.

== Timeline ==
Key Events Related to the BVT Raid
Date	Event	Significance	Section(s)
Feb 28, 2018	Austria BVT Raid	Police raid on domestic intelligence agency, seizure of data, suspension of officials.	1, 3
Aug 2018	Austrian Court Ruling	Declared the police raid on the BVT largely illegal, undermining the official justification.	7
Late 2021	Dissolution of BVT	The BVT was dissolved and replaced by the DSN, a long-term consequence of the raid and other issues.	1, 8
Ongoing	Concerns about FPÖ and Russian Influence	Persistent mistrust from international partners and concerns about foreign interference in Austrian politics and intelligence.	2, 8, 9
Nov 2, 2020	Vienna Terror Attack	Highlighted potential failures within the BVT, possibly linked to the disruption caused by the 2018 raid, and further contributed to the agency's dissolution.	8, 10
2017-2019	FPÖ in Governing Coalition	Crucial context for understanding potential political motivations behind the raid, as the FPÖ controlled the Interior Ministry.	2
Throughout	Reduction/Cessation of Intelligence Sharing with Other Countries	A significant immediate and long-term consequence, damaging Austria's international standing and security capabilities.	6, 9
Throughout	Parliamentary Inquiry	Investigated the raid, revealing political involvement and the need for reform.	7
