= 2015 Graz car attack =

Vehicle attack in Graz, Austria

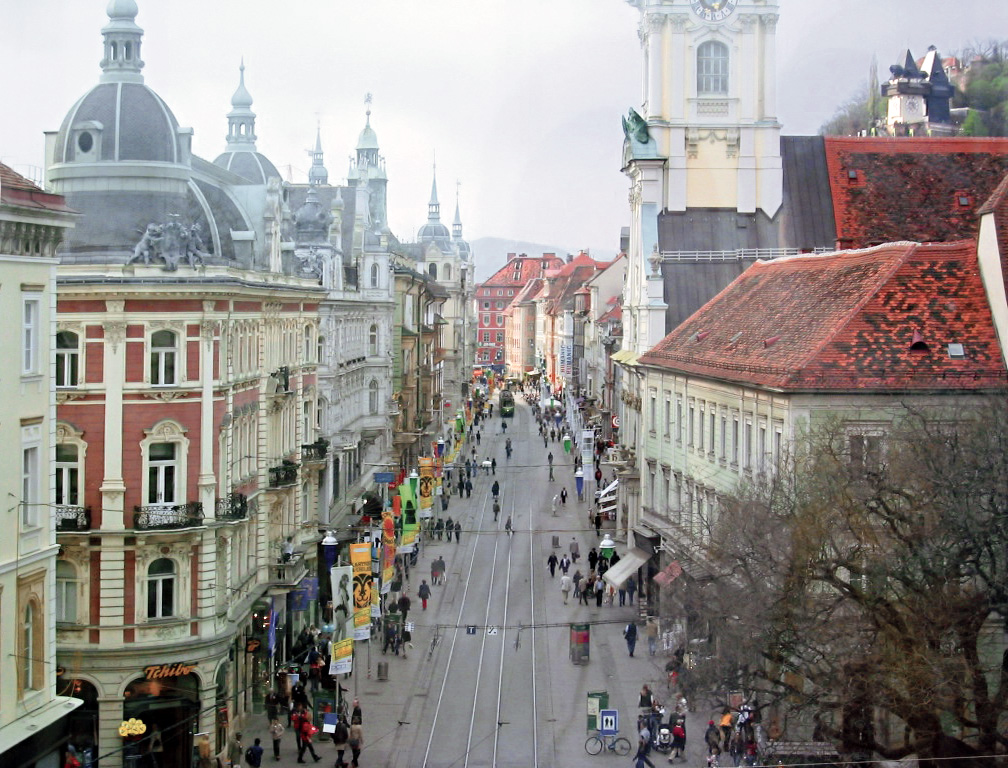
- The Grazer Herrengasse, one of the crime scenes (photo from 2003)
- Location: Graz, Austria
- Date: 20 June 2015; 11 years ago 12:15 p.m. – 12:20 p.m.
- Weapons: Daewoo Rexton; Knife
- Deaths: 4
- Injuries: 36
- Perpetrator: Alen Rizvan Rizvanović

Route of the attack with markers at sites where fatalities occurred

On 20 June 2015, Alen Rizvanović, an Austrian citizen born in Bosnia, drove a sports utility vehicle at high speeds through the center of Graz, Austria, killing three people in a matter of minutes and injuring 43 others, one of them dying months later. At one point during the attack, Rizvanović got out of the vehicle and stabbed two passers-by.

Rizvanović was arrested and given a life sentence. He committed suicide in prison in September 2023.

== Attack ==
On 20 June 2015, a vehicular attack occurred at 12:15 p.m. in the centre of Graz. Alen Rizvanović, the driver, intentionally killed and injured pedestrians and cyclists by hitting them with a green SUV-type Daewoo Rexton, which he was driving at an estimated speed of up to 100 kilometres (62 mi) per hour. According to a spokesperson, the rampage started in Zweiglgasse, where one victim died. Rizvanović then drove through the city, passing over the Augartenbrücke and entering Herrengasse, where he killed two more people. He then crashed into a café's seating area in the Hauptplatz (main square), where an event related to the 2015 Austrian Grand Prix was being held.

During his attack, Rizvanović jumped out of his car briefly, ran up to an elderly couple in front of a grocery shop, and stabbed them with a knife, wounding the man severely. He then drove to the police station at Schmiedgasse and was arrested by police without resistance. A witness compared the sounds of chairs and tables being knocked over by the vehicle to a "gunfight". The attack lasted for five minutes. Sixty ambulances and four helicopters were sent to transport injured victims to hospitals.

=== Victims ===
Three people were immediately killed in the attack and a total of 43 others, including at least three children, were wounded, six of them severely and one critically. One person died in hospital months later. Most of the victims were hit by Rizvanović's car, some stabbed by him with a knife. The identity of one of the fatalities remained unknown for weeks.

== Perpetrator ==
Alen Rizvan Rizvanović was 26 years old when he carried out the attack. At the age of four he had fled along with his parents to Austria during the Bosnian War as a refugee and later became an Austrian citizen. Rizvanović found employment as a truck driver. He was under a restraining order filed on 28 May, which kept him away from the home of his wife and two young children following a domestic violence report being filed against him a month prior. As a result of the restraining order, police revoked Rizvanović's weapon's licence and confiscated a semiautomatic firearm and ammunition belonging to him.

The motive was not immediately clear. A few hours after the attack, police ruled out any religious or ideological motives. When he was arrested, Rizvanović claimed that he felt persecuted by "Turks". On 23 June, a remand was imposed on him. The day before, Austrian newspaper Die Presse reported that the Federal Office for the Protection of the Constitution and Counterterrorism is "interested in Rizvanović". There were claims that Rizvanović had shifted to a stricter interpretation of Islam. Prior to the attack, he had more than 2,500 followers on Twitter, many of them from Arab countries and at least one a suspected neo-Nazi, but he deleted all of the tweets and messages on his online accounts except for one, which indicated that the crime was premeditated.

Rizvanović was tried and sentenced to life imprisonment in 2016. On the morning of 23 September 2023, Rizvanović was found dead in his solitary cell at the Stein Correctional Facility. His death was ruled a suicide.

== Reactions ==
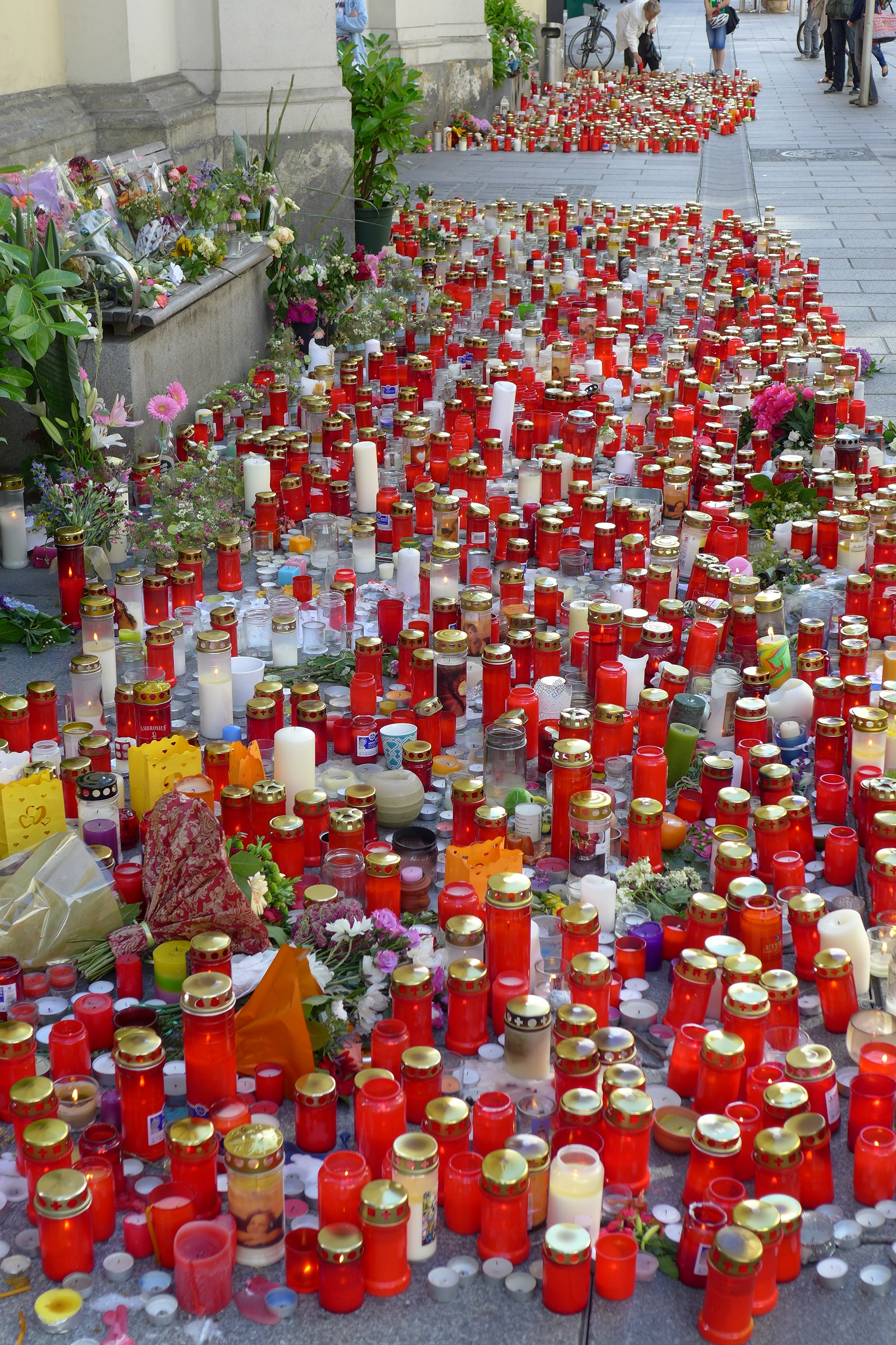
A place for condolences in the Herrengasse, in front of the Grazer Stadtpfarr Church (22 June 2015)

Austrian president Heinz Fischer issued a statement and said he was "deeply shocked" by the attack. Johanna Mikl-Leitner, the Austrian interior minister, said during a visit to the scene of the attack, "What happened here is unthinkable. There is no excuse for it." Styrian governor Hermann Schützenhöfer issued a statement, saying, "We are shocked and dismayed... there is no explanation and no excuse for this attack." Graz mayor Siegfried Nagl, who personally witnessed the rampage unfold from his scooter, ordered events in Graz to be canceled and black flags of mourning to be raised on municipal buildings.

== See also ==
- 2020 Vienna attack
- 2024 Vienna terrorism plot
- 2025 Villach stabbing attack
- 2025 Graz school shooting
