= Taylor Swift Vienna concert terror plot =

Failed terrorist attack in Austria

- Location: 48.2072°N 16.4210°E; Ernst-Happel-Stadion, Vienna, Austria
- Date: 8–10 August 2024
- Target: Taylor Swift; Eras Tour concert attendees and onlookers
- Attack type: Suicide bombing; arson; mass shooting; mass stabbing; vehicle ramming; terrorism
- Motive: Islamic extremism

In August 2024, a terrorism plot by followers of the Islamic State, a jihadist militant group, targeting a concert of the American singer-songwriter Taylor Swift at the Ernst-Happel-Stadion in Vienna was uncovered and neutralised. Three males, aged 17, 18, and 19, were arrested in Austria for involvement in the plot that was intended to mass murder concert attendees as well as onlookers in the stadium vicinity; a Syrian juvenile male in Germany was charged in 2025 for aiding those in Austria.

Three concerts of the Eras Tour, Swift's sixth concert tour, were scheduled to take place from 8–10 August 2024 at the Ernst-Happel-Stadion—the penultimate stop of the tour's European leg, in what would have been Swift's first-ever concerts in Austria. The tickets went on sale in July 2023 and all three dates sold out within the first few hours, marking the fastest and largest ticket-sale in Austrian history; over 200,000 people had been expected to attend the shows in the stadium premises. The police detained a suspect of terrorism a day before the first show, stating that the concerts could proceed as planned with additional security measures in place. However, following the arrest of a second suspect and a confirmation by the Government of Austria of the extensive terrorist plan to attack the tour and Vienna at-large, Swift's event partner Barracuda Music cancelled the concerts indefinitely—a decision welcomed by Austrian chancellor Karl Nehammer.

Authorities stated that the suspects, who were all teenagers, had been radicalised online and were found to be in possession of explosive chemicals, bladed articles, al-Qaeda-related devices, counterfeit money, and a car equipped with a police siren for organising a suicide attack on the concert. The Austrian Federal Police, EKO Cobra, the United States Intelligence Community, and Europol collaborated to prevent the attack. Nehammer proposed empowering Austrian law enforcement agencies with the power to decrypt private digital communications within judicial purview to combat organised crime. The Eras Tour's final European shows took place in London's Wembley Stadium with additional security and administrative support from the Greater London Authority and Metropolitan Police, which in turn gave rise to a political controversy in the UK. Swift discussed the terror plot and its impact on the Eras Tour in her documentary series, Taylor Swift: The End of an Era (2025).

== Background ==
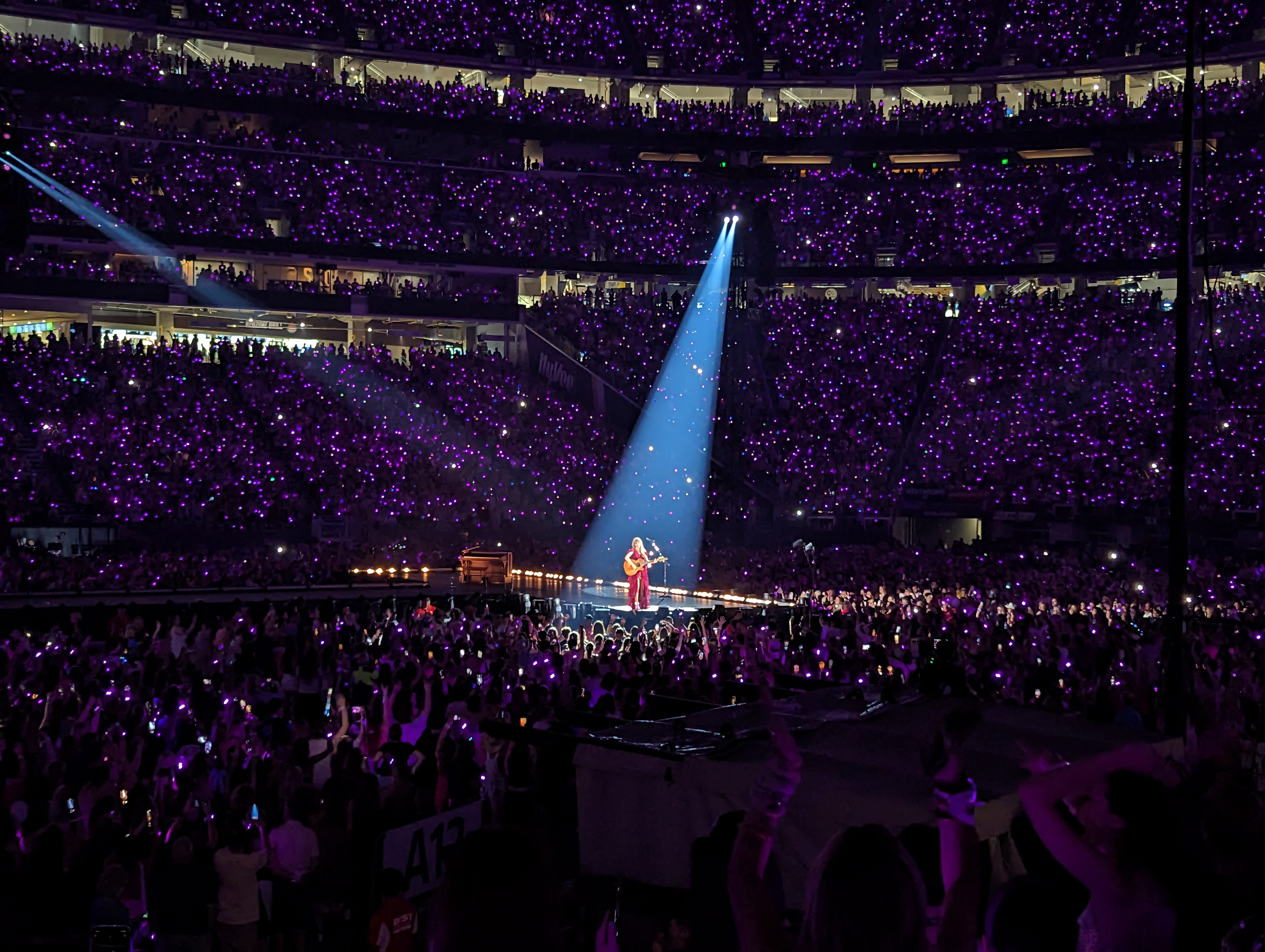
The Eras Tour by Taylor Swift was a stadium tour that experienced an unprecedented demand for tickets, with all nights sold out.

Vienna is the capital and the most populous city of Austria. It is also the fifth-largest city by population in the European Union. Vienna saw its first terror attack on 2 November 2020.

The American singer-songwriter Taylor Swift embarked on her sixth concert tour, the Eras Tour, which commenced on 17 March 2023, in Glendale, Arizona, United States, and concluded on 8 December 2024, in Vancouver, British Columbia, Canada, with over 100 shows across five continents. The Eras Tour quickly became the world's highest-grossing tour of all time within its first 60 shows, becoming the first tour ever to surpass $1 billion in revenue. The tour has had a documented cultural and economic impact worldwide, which has been the subject of widespread media coverage and analysis.

Swift announced the European leg of the tour on 20 June 2023, including one concert at the Ernst-Happel-Stadion in Vienna, in what would have been Swift's first-ever show in the country. Following popular demand, eight more shows were added to the leg, which saw Vienna receive a second show. Further demand expanded the European leg once again, with 14 additional shows in continental Europe, including a third consecutive show in Vienna.

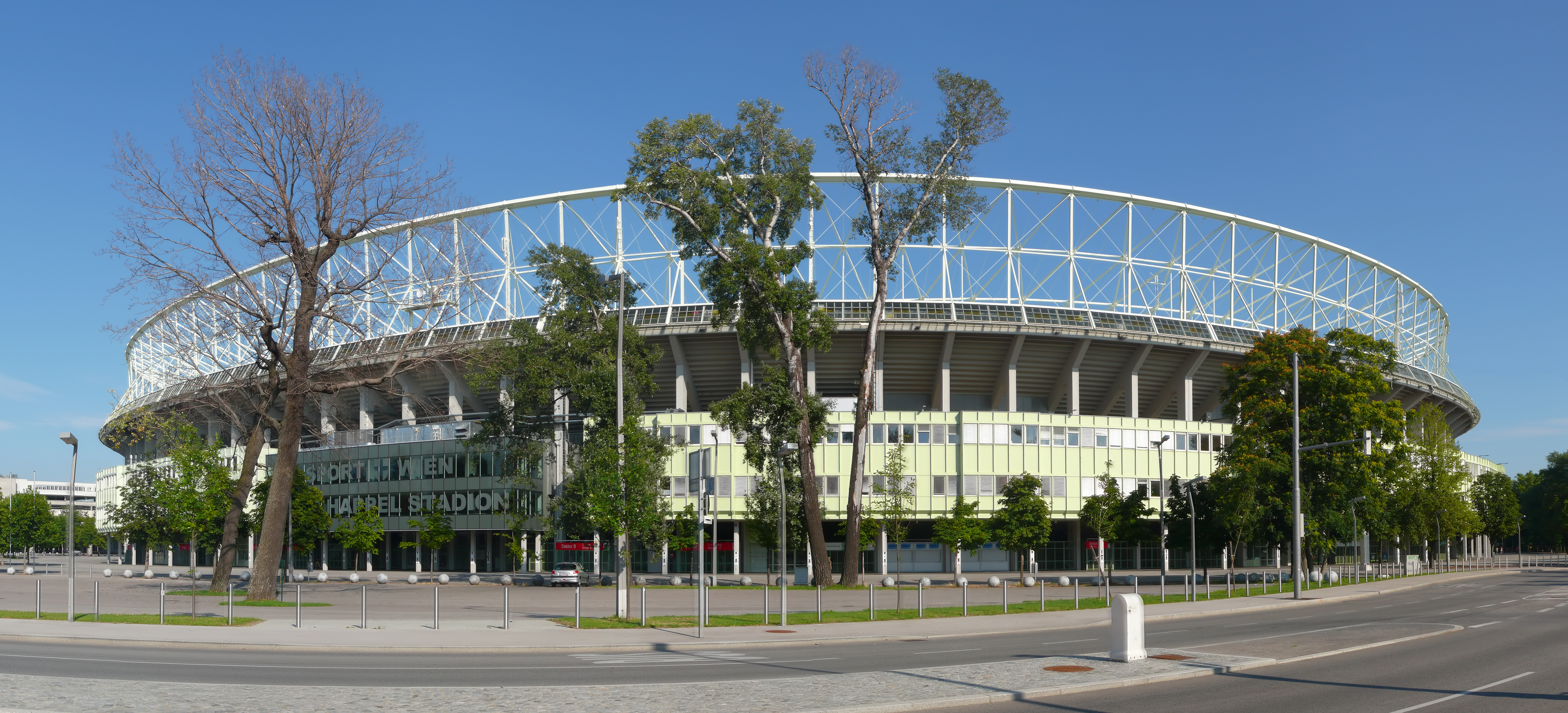
The Ernst-Happel-Stadion, the venue of Swift's Eras Tour concerts in Vienna which the perpetrators had planned to attack

All 170,000 tickets for the three Vienna shows sold out within the first few hours of sale, marking the largest and fastest ticket sale ever in the history of Austria. Vienna experienced a significant impact on its rental market, with booking rates for the nights of the concerts recorded in February 2024, 44 percent higher than at the same point the previous year. By the end of March 2024, the number of nights booked in the city for the length of the tour's stay in the second week of August had risen by 430 percent compared with the same period in 2023.

== Suspects and arrests ==
On 7 August 2024, media reported that the Austrian federal police took a 19-year-old male, a dual citizen of Austria and North Macedonia with Albanian descent into custody for allegedly plotting a terror attack on Swift's concerts in Vienna. His name has been identified as Beran A. (Aliji, Aliyi), according to The Guardian, even though no names were officially released in line with Austrian privacy rules. He was previously known to the authorities as a suspect of terrorism and was arrested following a large police operation in Ternitz, Lower Austria, where his house is located, with over 100 nearby residents evacuated temporarily. The operation crew had told the civilians that there was a gas leak. Austrian public security director-general Franz Ruf stated that a bomb squad found chemical substances and technical devices at the residence, which were sent for forensic examination. However, Ruf assured that the shows would take place as scheduled, with additional security measures in place to deter remaining threats, as over 65,000 fans were expected to attend each day, with 20,000 more outside the venue. The suspect's parents, originated from Gostivar, had been away at the time of the raid.

A second suspect, a 17-year-old male dual citizen of Austria and Bosnia and Herzegovina with Turkish and Croatian roots, who was in contact with the 19-year-old, was arrested on 7 August as well, later in the afternoon. EKO Cobra, the federal police tactical unit of Austria, assisted with the arrests of the suspects. Police stated that the suspects were radicalized on the Internet and had pledged their allegiance to the Islamic State (IS), a jihadist militant Islamist group, in July 2024. Vienna was a target of their planned attack, with "a particular focus" on Swift's concerts. The second suspect was hired by a facility company providing security services at the stadium during Swift's concerts.

A 15-year-old Turkish citizen, who had been asked by the main suspect about ignition mechanisms and was found near the stadium, was placed under police custody for intensive questioning, but not arrested; he was then released and treated as a witness, while the first two suspects were transferred to a prison in Wiener Neustadt, Lower Austria, held in a pre-trial detention with a state prosecutor appointed for each of them. Police stated that the 15-year-old was not part of the plot but that he knew many of its details, helping corroborate "some key elements of the main suspect's confession."

Despite officials saying that they were not looking for any more suspects, Gerhard Karner, the minister of the interior of Austria, stated on 9 August that an 18-year-old Iraqi male has been detained as the third suspect in the terror plot. According to the Kronen Zeitung, the third suspect has been living in Austria as a refugee. Karner also announced that he had initiated the process of revoking the 18-year-old's residence permit under a special provision "designed to deal with dangerous refugees or immigrants" as he had also pledged himself to the IS.

On 27 June 2025, the German Federal Public Prosecutor general announced that a juvenile identified only as Mohammed A. has been indicted on charges of supporting a foreign terrorist organization and attempting a serious act of violence. Prosecutors stated that Mohammed A., a Syrian national, was a follower of the Islamic State and helped an Austrian teenager make plans to bomb the Eras Tour concerts in Vienna in August 2024. He was accused of interpreting bomb-building instructions and translating an Islamic State terrorist group oath of allegiance for the main suspect of the attack plot. On 26 August 2025, Mohammed A. was convicted by a court in Berlin and sentenced to a suspended 18-month prison term.

== Investigation ==
The articles discovered at the 19-year-old, first suspect's residence were subsequently revealed to be precursors for explosives, blank ammunition, timers, machetes, steroids, and €21,000 in counterfeit cash, as well as al-Qaeda-related items and propaganda that indicated "concrete preparatory acts" in the "advanced stages". The police also stated that he "had successfully fabricated bombs using instructions found online". Upon further inquiry, it was determined that the first suspect "had planned to execute a deadly suicide attack during the concert", aiming to kill a large number of people. He had also "drastically changed" his physical appearance since July 2024. One of the suspect's neighbors told Puls 4 that he mostly "kept to himself" and had grown a "Taliban" beard recently. Christian Samwald, mayor of Ternitz, said "there had been shock and dismay in Ternitz about the news because there had been no prior indication that the youth harbored any radical inclinations."

According to United States officials, United States Intelligence Community had uncovered the threat to Swift's concerts in Vienna when the 19-year-old uploaded an "oath of allegiance" to the Islamic State on the messaging app Telegram in early July, whilst participating in IS-K Telegram groups. US Intelligence then passed the information to the Europol and the Austrian police, cautioning of the suspects' plans for a terrorist attack. Austrian authorities then planned the police operation in Ternitz. US investigators stated that the plot was only assisted but not operated by the IS, and that the Austrian law enforcement is looking for an additional person or people who may have some knowledge of the plans. The police later stated that "the pair had aspirational plans for attacking Vienna's major events sites and specifically had homed in on this coming weekend's Swift concerts", and planned to use explosives, incendiary devices, and knives to carry it out. The Macedonian Ministry of Internal Affairs confirmed that it has received a request from Austrian investigators to look into the 19-year-old's background.

On 8 August 2024, it was reported that the 19-year-old, who is regarded as the "main suspect", fully confessed to attack plans during a police interrogation, according to Omar Haijawi-Pirchner, head of Austria's Directorate of State Security and Intelligence. Most of the plans and preparations were made at the main suspect's home. Haijawi-Pirchner stated that the 19-year-old had resigned his job at a steelworks factory, also in Ternitz, telling colleagues he "still had big plans" and that he confessed he had sought to kill "as many people as possible" by driving a car into the crowds before using knives, machetes and the homemade explosive devices. Kurier reported that he had stolen chemicals from the factory in order to build the bombs. His accomplice, the 17-year-old, had also broken up with his girlfriend the preceding week, which investigators believe was done in preparation for the attack. As per an Austria Press Agency report on 11 August, the 19-year-old then denied involvement in the plot and claimed he is not a supporter of the IS; his lawyer argued that her client simply wanted to be "cool", wanted to use explosives "out in a forest but never intended to kill people" and "ordered [knives and other weapons] on Amazon because he liked them."

On 10 August, the investigation continued to scrutinise the "networks" of the suspects. The Ministry of the Interior claimed in a statement that investigators had turned to "evaluating physical and electronic evidence", and would interrogate more individuals and search additional locations. On 11 August, Karl Nehammer, the chancellor of Austria since 2021, claimed that "more ISIS supporters" have been identified.

On 28 August, David S. Cohen stated at the Intelligence Summit, Washington D.C., that the information used by Austrian police on 7 August to disrupt the plot was provided to them by the U.S. Central Intelligence Agency (CIA): "They were plotting to kill a huge number, tens of thousands of people at this concert, I am sure many Americans [...] The Austrians were able to make those arrests because the agency and our partners in the intelligence community provided them information about what this ISIS-connected group was planning to do." Cohen did not disclose how the CIA obtained the information about the planned attack.

== Impact, reaction and aftermath ==
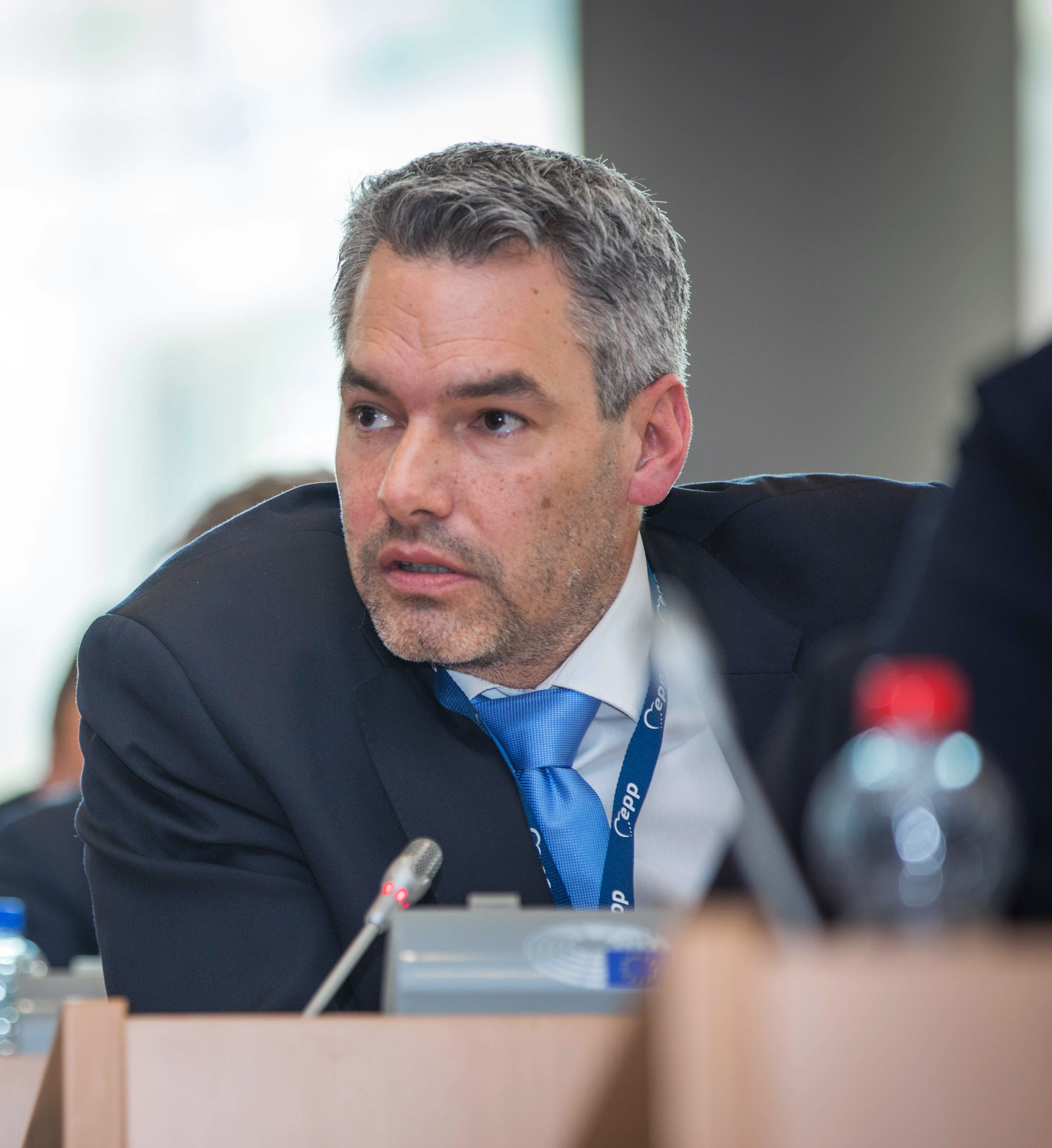
Austrian chancellor Karl Nehammer considered the plot a tragedy averted as the perpetrators wanted to leave a "trail of blood" in Vienna. He claimed that "the threat of Islamic terrorism in Europe is on the rise."

Following the arrest of the second suspect, the event organiser of Swift's concerts in Vienna, Barracuda Music, announced that all three shows would be cancelled with tickets refunded, after receiving confirmation from the government of Austria of the elaborate terrorist plan. The organiser stated, "We have no choice but to cancel the three scheduled shows for everyone's safety", with all tickets "automatically refunded" within the next 10 days. In a subsequent press conference, Barracuda pointed out that Swift's management had played a significant part in the decision, and that a key moment was when they were informed that the 17-year-old suspect would have worked on site in the stadium before and during the concerts. It marked the first time Swift had cancelled a concert since 2014, when her Bangkok show was called off due to the military coup in Thailand.

Austrian chancellor Karl Nehammer released a statement: "The cancelation of the Taylor Swift concerts by the organizers is a bitter disappointment for all fans in Austria. The situation surrounding the apparently planned terrorist attack in Vienna was very serious. Thanks to the intensive cooperation of our police and the newly established DSN with foreign services, the threat was recognized early, combated and a tragedy prevented. Many thanks to the emergency services who are currently investigating at full speed." He also praised Swift and her team for acting "responsibly" in agreeing to cancel the concerts, and defended the decision by highlighting that "the arrests had taken place too close to the scheduled concerts to allow them to go ahead." In a different briefing, Nehammer asserted that "the attack was foiled with the help of international intelligence as Austrian law does not allow censorship of messenger applications."

Close relatives of the main suspect's family in Gostivar, North Macedonia, opined "it looks someone has manipulated him because we are not such a family".

The US national security spokesperson of the White House, John Kirby, spoke to reporters on 10 August regarding the role of the US in providing intelligence to Austria: "The United States has an enduring focus on our counterterrorism mission. We work closely with partners all over the world to monitor and disrupt threats. And so as part of that work, the United States did share information with Austrian partners to enable the disruption of a threat to Taylor Swift's concerts there in Vienna." Victoria Reggie Kennedy, the US ambassador to Austria, expressed sympathy with Swifties in a post on Twitter.

Bence Rétvári, parliamentary state secretary of the Hungarian Ministry of Interior, blamed pro-migration politicians and opined that incidents such as this plot and the Southport stabbing constitute a "dire warning" for Europe. He added that migration has compromised safety and security in the continent, and demanded action from the European Commission. Some American journalists opined that the US requires a more robust counter-terrorism policy and considered the plot and other 2020s attacks to be a result of president Joe Biden's decision to withdraw US troops from Afghanistan and other sensitive areas.

On 22 August, Swift addressed the plot for the first time publicly. She lamented the cancelled shows, asserting it is better to mourn shows than lost lives, and thanked authorities for their efforts in thwarting the attack. She also clarified that she had not commented earlier to ensure her fans' safety.

In February 2026, Vienna prosecutors' office filed charges against 21-year old Beran A. in a Wiener Neustadt court, accusing him of producing a small amount of the explosive triacetone triperoxide and attempting to purchase weapons illegally. He was sentenced to fifteen years in prison in May 2026.

Prior to his conviction, Beran was previously incarcerated at Josefstadt Prison in Vienna before relocating to Wiener Neustadt Prison before his trial. Shortly after his sentencing, police confirmed that Beran and his co-defendant will remain incarcerated at Wiener Neustadt rather than transferring him back to Josefstadt pending in a final classification and permanent placement.

=== Fans ===
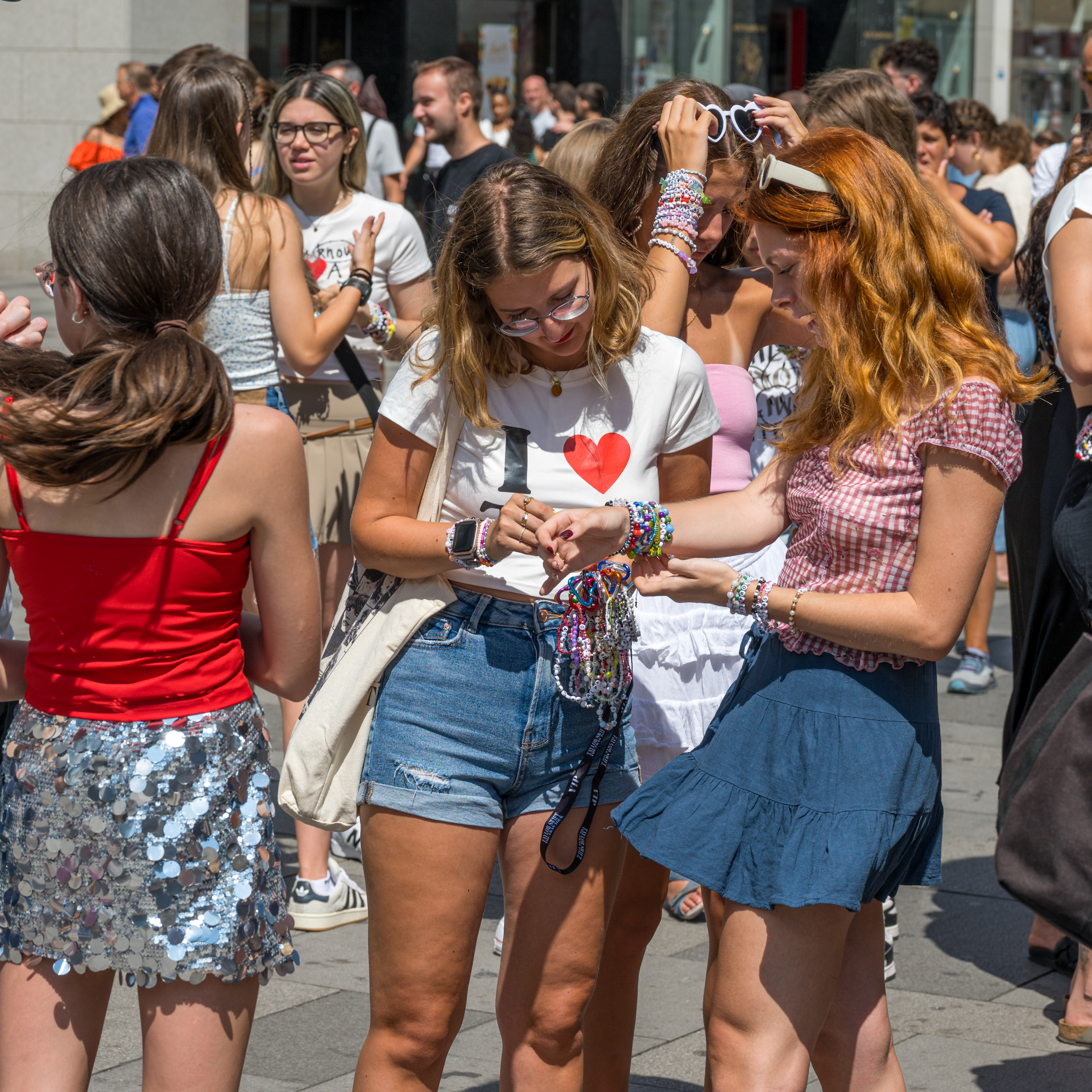
Fans gathered for the cancelled shows, exchanging friendship bracelets in Vienna streets.

Media reported that the news of cancelled Vienna shows "devastated" Swift's fans, as many of them "had spent thousands of euros on travel and lodging in the expensive capital city—often travelling from different countries in order to watch Swift perform live." Videos shared on social media showed some fans learning the cancellation partway through their travel while others were already lodged in Vienna.

On 8 August, thousands of Swift's fans who had travelled to Vienna for the concerts gathered in public squares to sing and celebrate Swift's music as an alternative to the cancelled shows. They organised spontaneous sing-alongs on the streets of Vienna, and were seen exchanging "tears, hugs and friendship bracelets as they formed gatherings across the city." Some fans congregated in churches of Vienna as well. The Lutheran City Church of Vienna offered fans a "place to stay and listen to Swift's music". Hundreds of fans gathered on Corneliusgasse, a street 5 kilometres from the Ernst-Happel-Stadion whose name resembles "Cornelia Street", a song from Swift's 2019 album Lover.

With permission from Swift and Disney+, Austrian public broadcaster ORF aired the tour's concert film, Taylor Swift: The Eras Tour, on its flagship channel ORF 1 at 21:45 CET on 10 August, for free. Disney+ also offered a free 7-day trial subscription "for anyone who missed the broadcast in Austria and Germany" until 12 August.

=== Security ===
Swift concluded the European leg of the Eras Tour with five shows in London between 15 and 20 August 2024. Mayor Sadiq Khan said London would "carry on" with hosting Swift's forthcoming concerts at the Wembley Stadium, as the city has "a huge amount of experience in policing these events, we're never complacent, many lessons were learned after the awful Manchester Arena attack." The Metropolitan Police stated, "there is nothing to indicate that the matters being investigated by the Austrian authorities will have an impact on upcoming events here in London. As always, we will continue to keep any new information under careful review." The UK Minister of State for Policing, Fire and Crime Prevention, Diana Johnson, spoke to LBC, promising that the Scotland Yard will look at "all the intelligence" ahead of Swift's London concerts.

It was reported that Swift was in a "lockdown" ahead of her London shows, having been given strict "presidential level" security to safeguard herself, her dancers and her touring crew. The administration of Wembley Stadium banned gathering outside the stadium, including tailgating, "to support with the safe entry and exit of everyone within the stadium." In Toronto, Canada, the penultimate stop of the Eras Tour, mayor of Toronto Olivia Chow promised that "comprehensive security will be in place" for the duration of Swift's concerts.

Nehammer, in an interview for Bild, opined that it has become mandatory for Austrian agencies to undergo technical upgrades "so they're on an equal footing with terrorists, with organised crime, so we can combat them," and in order to do that, "it's vital that messenger services like WhatsApp, Signal, Telegram can be decrypted for security authorities, under judicial oversight, while upholding the rule of law". At the time, Bild noted Nehammer was seeking re-election in the 2024 Austrian legislative election.

Organisers of the Sziget Festival, Hungary's largest music festival, increased security readiness for the 2024 edition of the event as a precautionary measure. The festival, which took place from 7 to 12 August 2024 on the Óbuda island in Budapest, the capital of Hungary, was reported to have been monitored by thousands of security staff—including Hungarian police officers and counter-terrorism experts—as well as up to 50 security cameras.

=== Economy ===
Ticket prices for the Eras Tour's London shows skyrocketed by nearly 2,000 per cent as fans rushed to "secure seats for the highly-anticipated concerts" on secondary platforms like Viagogo, Vivid Seats, StubHub, and Gigsberg. CBS 58 reported that the cancelled Eras Tour stops in Vienna resulted in a significant economic loss for the city. Austrian Airlines, the country's leading airline, said it had received numerous enquiries about refunds from disappointed Swifties who booked flights to Vienna for the now-cancelled concerts and that an exception was being applied to its usual refund policy.

Multiple businesses in Vienna, including eateries, pubs and beaches, provided respite, offers and deals to Swifties to "make up" for the cancelled concerts. Vienna's museums, such as the Albertina, the Mozarthaus Vienna, the Haus der Musik, KunstHausWien, the Jewish Museum, and the Museum of Applied Arts, waived admission fees and gave free passes to ticket-holding Swifties. Several Swifties were invited to the Swarovski Kristallwelten, where they each received a free necklace from the brand with a variety of crystal charms, after showing their cancelled tickets.

=== Documentaries ===
- Swift's 2025 documentary series about the tour, Taylor Swift: The End of an Era, covered the terror plot in its first episode.
- A German-Austrian documentary in-production as of 2026, co-directed by Andreas Pichler and Veronika Kaserer, will explore the terror plot, toxic masculinity, and online radicalization as opposed to the inclusivity and youth subculture of the Swifties.

== See also ==
- 2020 Vienna attack
- 2015 Graz car attack
- 2025 Villach stabbing attack
- 2025 Graz school shooting
- 2024 Southport stabbing, a mass-stabbing attack targeting children at a Swift-themed workshop days before the Vienna plot reveal
- Death of Ana Clara Benevides, another incident concerning the Eras Tour in Brazil
- Crocus City Hall attack, a 2024 terrorist attack at a concert in Moscow
