= Anastasiia Tsybuliak =

Ukrainian scientist

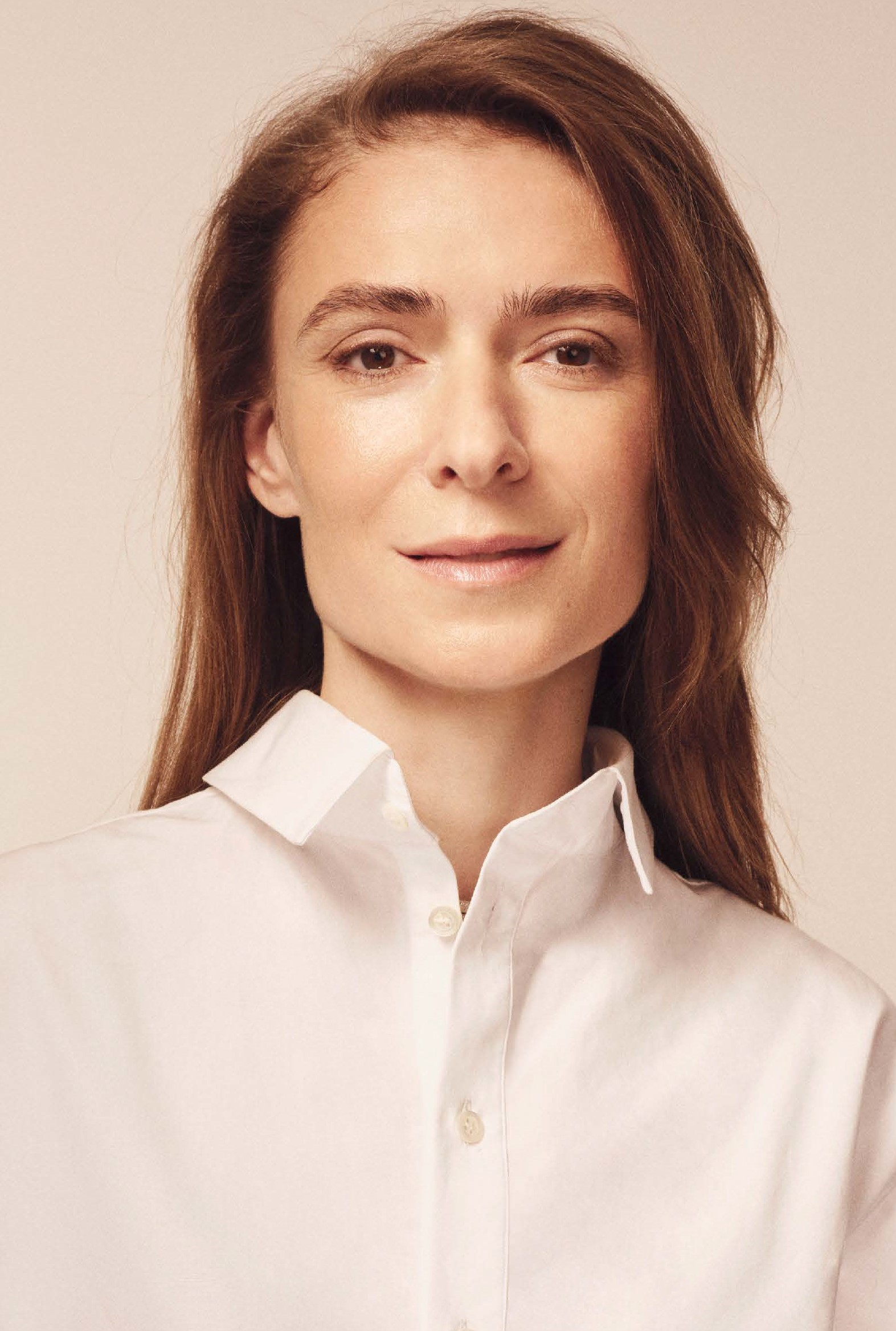
- Anastasiia Tsybuliak, 2024
- Born: February 23, 1984 (age 42); Kyiv, Ukraine
- Other name: Анастасія Геннадіївна Цибуляк
- Education: Taras Shevchenko National University of Kyiv
- Occupations: scientist, eco-activist
- Website: anastasiiatsybuliak.com

Anastasiia Tsybuliak (Ukrainian: Анастасія Геннадіївна Цибуляк, born February 23, 1984) is a Ukrainian scientist in the field of economics, entrepreneur, eco-activist, public figure, founder of Glossary Organic Products, Ukraine's leading importer of certified organic goods and Glossary Eco Foundation. She is a co-founder of alternative energy investment company of Ukraine Trident Energy.

She is a Doctor of Economic Sciences (2020), PhD in Political Sciences (2011). Since 2014 she has been an associate professor, and, since 2021, a professor, of the Department of International Economics, Business and Management in Ukrainian-American Concordia University.

== Early life ==
In 2006, she graduated from the National Academy of Management and received two diplomas with honors in the economics of entrepreneurship (Bachelor in Finance), and in the «Law» (Bachelor in Law) specialties.

In 2008, she graduated from Institute of International relations of Taras Shevchenko National University of Kyiv, and received a master's degree with honors in the specialty international relations (international political scientist, English translator).

In 2014, she graduated from the mini-MBA program at the London School of Business and Finance.

In 2011, she graduated from postgraduate studies of Taras Shevchenko National University of Kyiv, Institute of International relations and received the degree of PhD in political sciences with the specialty political problems of international systems and global development. In 2020, she defended doctoral program in Institute of International relations of Taras Shevchenko National University of Kyiv, with research project «Ecology of world trade in the conditions of the transformation of global development». She is an author of more than 50 scientific works in domestic and foreign editions of economic and political areas. Also, she is a frequent participant of scientific conferences and author of articles on environmental topics.

She speaks fluently in 5 languages: Ukrainian, English, French, Romanian and Russian.

== Career ==
In 2009, she founded the company Glossary Organic Products – the largest company in Ukraine selling certified organic products and the first one that actively develops the organic movement in the Ukrainian market. The company's activities are focused on implementing the principles of environmental and social responsibility, sustainable consumption and conscious thinking.

Since 2014 she has been an associate professor, and, since 2021, a professor, of the Ukrainian-American Concordia University. She teaches the theory of international relations» and international economics disciplines, as well as the author's course based on her own doctoral dissertation «Ecology of world trade in the conditions of the transformation of global development».

She is a participant of ten international programs Young Investors Program and business trainings of the company Ernst & Young.

== Public activity and eco activism ==
Tsybuliak is an active public figure, eco-initiatives patron, and organizer of environmental public events in Ukraine.

In 2021 she founded the Glossary Foundation eco-fund — a non-profit charitable organization with the aim of ecological enlightenment of the consciousness of Ukrainians and protection of the environment.

Also in 2021, she launched an ecological domestic tourism initiative Glossary Sustainable Tourism — with the aim of developing the tourist potential of little-known places in Ukraine. In the same year, together with the Glossary foundation, she founded the social eco-initiative «Farms for city children». The purpose of the campaign is to introduce urban children to life on farms in order to develop in them respect for the environment and work, as well as to familiarize them with agriculture in Ukraine.

In December 2021, she initiated a charity event for financial assistance during the pandemic to doctors of the Kyiv Railway Transport Hospital No.1.

After the Russian invasion in February 2022, she organized a center to help Ukraine from abroad. The purpose of the organization is to collect and send humanitarian aid from Europe to Ukraine.
