= Lisa Aldali =

Austrian politician

Member of the National Council
- Incumbent
- Assumed office 7 November 2025

Personal details
- Born: 13 September 1989 (age 37) Oberndorf bei Salzburg
- Party: NEOS

Lisa Aldali (born 13 September 1989) is an Austrian educator and politician (NEOS). From October 2023 to January 2025, she was the state spokesperson for the party NEOS Salzburg – The New Austria and Liberal Forum. Since 7 November 2025, she has been a member of the National Council.

== Education and early career ==
Lisa Aldali attended the Lofer secondary school, then completed the two-year Caritas School for Economics and Social Studies in Salzburg, before beginning her apprenticeship as an office administrator in 2007. After completing her apprenticeship, she obtained her university entrance qualification (BRP) and enrolled at the Salzburg University of Education. She earned her Bachelor of Education degree in German and History/Political Education. Her political development was supported by the "Talentboard" training program of the Parteiakademie NEOS Lab. As part of this program, she studied, among other things, the Austrian Parliament, Belgian Federal Parliament and European Parliament. During and after her apprenticeship, Lisa Aldali worked at Pro mente austria in Salzburg. She is currently employed by the State of Salzburg and teaches at a secondary school in Lofer.

== Political career ==
From 2016, Aldali was a inactive member of NEOS. In April 2022, she entered the party scene and applied to be a candidate in the list compilation process for the 2023 Salzburg state election, as well as for another place on the state list. In November, she became regional coordinator in Pinzgau and was nominated as a high-potential candidate for a six-month training program within the party.

Following the 2023 Salzburg state election, in which NEOS failed to reach the 5% threshold and thus lost their seats in the state parliament, state spokesperson Andrea Klambauer announced her resignation on 25 April 2023. In October 2023, Lisa Aldali was elected state spokesperson of NEOS Salzburg with 85 % of the members' votes.

In March 2024, she ran for mayor in her hometown of Unken, but was clearly defeated by the incumbent Florian Juritsch from the Austrian People's Party (ÖVP), who received over 90% of the votes.

In January 2025, she resigned from her position as spokesperson for NEOS in the state of Salzburg. In May 2025, Sepp Schellhorn was elected as her successor.

In October 2025, Stephanie Krisper announced her resignation from her seat in the National Council. Aldali succeeded her on 7 November 2025, in the 28th legislative period.

== Personal life ==
Lisa Aldali is married and has a son.

== See also ==
- List of members of the 28th National Council of Austria
