= Gert-René Polli =

Austrian official

- Born: 10 August 1960 (age 66)

Gert-René Polli (born 10 August 1960) was head of the Austrian Office for the Protection of the Constitution and Counterterrorism from 2002 to 2008.
