= 2020 Vienna attack =

Islamist terrorist attack in Vienna

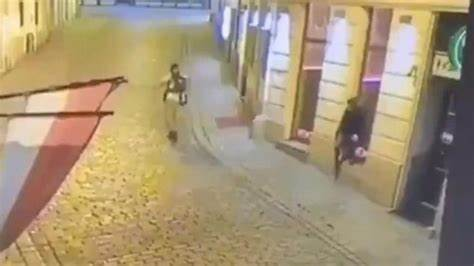
- CCTV still of Kujtim Fejzulai during the attack
- Location: 48°12′43″N 16°22′29″E; Innere Stadt, Vienna, Austria
- Date: 2 November 2020; 19:59:20 - 20:08:48 (CET)
- Target: Civilians
- Attack type: Mass shooting; Islamic terrorism
- Weapons: Zastava M70 assault rifle; Tokarev handgun; machete
- Deaths: 5 (including the perpetrator)
- Injuries: 23 (18 by gunfire)
- Perpetrator: Kujtim Fejzulai
- Motive: Islamic extremism inspired by ISIS

On 2 November 2020, a series of shootings took place in Vienna, Austria a few hours before the city was scheduled to enter a lockdown as a result of the COVID-19 pandemic. A lone gunman started shooting in the busy city centre, killing four civilians and injuring 23 others, seven critically, including a police officer. The attacker was killed by police and was later identified as an ISIL sympathizer. Officials said that the attack was an incident of Islamist terrorism.

== Attack ==
Before the attack, at around 16:00, Kujtim Fejzulai uploaded a confession video on his social media before making a call to the Le Salzgries restaurant. At 17:44, Fejzulai left his apartment to walk to the city center. He uploaded two more photos to social media at 19:17 and 19:26 respectively. Fejzulai arrived at Schwedenplatz at 19:31. From there, he walked to the Le Salzgries restaurant. He walked around and passed it by twice until he realized it was closed. Fejzulai changed course and travelled to Seitenstettengasse. He briefly walked towards the St. Rupert's Church before walking south towards a hotel building to prepare for the shooting. When the shooting started, he was armed with a rifle, a handgun, and a machete and was wearing a fake explosive belt that was underneath his jacket.

The first shots were fired at 19:59:20, when Fejzulai fired at a group of people to his right. The group were chatting at the top of the Jerusalem Stairs. Fejzulai fired two lethal shots at a 21-year-old man in that group. Fejzulai ran north up Desider-Friedmann-Square and opened fire on a couple who were walking to his left, injuring one. He continued north to the St. Rupert's Church and opened fire to his right on a beer garden located at the corner of Judengasse and the church. He wounded eight people with gunfire. After shooting at the beer garden, Fejzulai turned to his left and opened fire at the terrace of the Salzamt restaurant, fatally shooting a 25-year-old woman. The shooter ran north to reach the stairs to the courtyard of St. Rupert's Church, only to realize the gate was locked. He retreated to the entrance of a closed restaurant to reload his rifle. Fejzulai ran towards Seitenstettengasse while firing more shots at people, hitting no one. Once at Seitenstettengasse, the shooter encountered a 44-year-old woman as he was walking down the alley. He opened fire on her with his rifle, hitting her with three shots and causing her to collapse. The shooter continued walking until he reached the terrace of the Krah Krah restaurant, which is located on Rabensteig. He opened fire on the patrons and wounded seven of them. The shooter turned around and ran back to the woman he had shot in Seitenstettengasse. He pulled out a Tokarev handgun from his waistband and shot at her twice, killing her. The shooter reloaded his rifle and ran to the Kaktus bar. He fired a single shot from his rifle at the building, hitting no one. The shooter ran back to Rabensteig and turned to his left to go north. The shooter reached the corner of Franz-Josefs-Kai and Rabensteig, and walked to his right. A restaurant owner was about to lock his restaurant's entrance. The shooter fired at him and injured him lethally. One of the restaurant's employees was also injured. The shooter ran east, then north, up through a pocket park area just southwest of the tram tracks. He reloaded his rifle. At 20:03:45, two police officers in a police car confronted him. He fired at the officers, hitting one in the thigh. Fejzulai ran away down Franz-Josefs-Kai towards the courtyard of St. Rupert's Church. While he was running, a bystander threw glass objects at him. He even briefly stopped to shoot at a rental car, hitting no one. The attack ended when the gunman was shot by police at 20:08:48 at the courtyard of St. Rupert's Church. The police shot him from 50 meters distance. The shooter fired 80 rounds in total, firing 78 from the Zastava rifle and 2 from the handgun. Bullet holes were found on a tanker, making police believe Fejzulai intended to cause an explosion mid-shooting.

The shooting took place four hours before the midnight start of a nationwide lockdown as new COVID-19 restrictions were due to come into force in Austria, including a 20:00 to 06:00 curfew. Crowds in bars and restaurants were enjoying a last evening out before the lockdown began.

== Casualties ==
Casualties by citizenship
Citizenship	Deaths	Injuries
Austria	3	13
Germany	1	4
Slovakia	-	2
Afghanistan	-	1
Bosnia and Herzegovina	-	1
China	-	1
Luxembourg	-	1
Total	4	23

Four people were killed by the attacker: they were a 39-year-old Austrian man, a 24-year-old German woman, a 44-year-old Austrian woman, and a 21-year-old Austrian man originally from North Macedonia. The attacker was also shot dead by the police at the scene.

Twenty-three other people were wounded with gunshot and stab wounds; thirteen citizens from Austria, four from Germany, two from Slovakia, and one each from Afghanistan, Bosnia and Herzegovina, China, and Luxembourg. Seven suffered life-threatening injuries. Among the wounded was a 28-year-old police officer who was shot and critically injured while responding to the attack. The wounded officer and an elderly woman were saved by a Palestinian and two Turkish-Austrian men, who carried them away from the attacker to ambulances. After confronting the attacker, one of the Turkish-Austrians was shot and wounded. The three men were praised for their actions.

== Investigation ==
Videos of the shooting surfaced, including one of the attacker shooting a civilian first with a rifle and then up close with a handgun. The police asked that witnesses not post videos and photographs on social media, but rather submit them to the authorities. As a result, the police received a large number of videos from the public following the attack, and an investigation team examined them for evidence.

On the morning of 3 November, searches of apartments linked with the perpetrator took place, and in his home they found a stockpile of ammunition. Austrian authorities said at 01:00 that at least one gunman remained on the run, but that afternoon Minister of the Interior Karl Nehammer said there was no indication of additional attackers. Officials stated that the attack was an act of Islamic terrorism.

ISIL claimed responsibility for the attack a day later, calling the attacker a "soldier of the caliphate" and posting one of his photos with guns and a knife, and released a video of the attacker pledging allegiance to the leader of ISIL, Abu Ibrahim al-Hashimi al-Qurashi. It was not clear, however, whether ISIL helped plan the attack; the group has a track record of claiming responsibility for lone wolf attacks.

== Perpetrator ==
The perpetrator was identified as 20-year-old Kujtim Fejzulai. He was born in Mödling, a town south of Vienna, in 2000, where he grew up, and lived in the town of Sankt Pölten, 53 kilometres (33 mi) west of Vienna. He was a dual citizen of Austria and North Macedonia of Albanian ethnic origin and was known to the Austrian Office for the Protection of the Constitution and Counterterrorism. He had been sentenced to 22 months imprisonment in April 2019, after he tried to cross the Turkish border into Syria to join ISIL; however, he was paroled in December 2019, eight months into the sentence. He was one of around 90 Austrian Islamists who have tried to reach Syria. An Austrian official said that investigators believed that he had worshipped at a mosque that Austrian intelligence services suspected of promulgating extremism. Fejzulai had previously taken part in a deradicalization programme run by the DERAD association.

Die Zeit reported that Fejzulai was known to Slovak police in Bratislava, who had reportedly hindered his purchase of ammunition and reported this to Austrian authorities. Weapons and ammunition with Slovak identification numbers have been used in several terrorist attacks in the past.

Hours before the attack, Fejzulai had pledged allegiance to ISIL in Arabic in an Instagram post, using the name Abu Dujana al-Albani. In the post he held an assault rifle, handgun, and machete across his chest.

== Aftermath ==
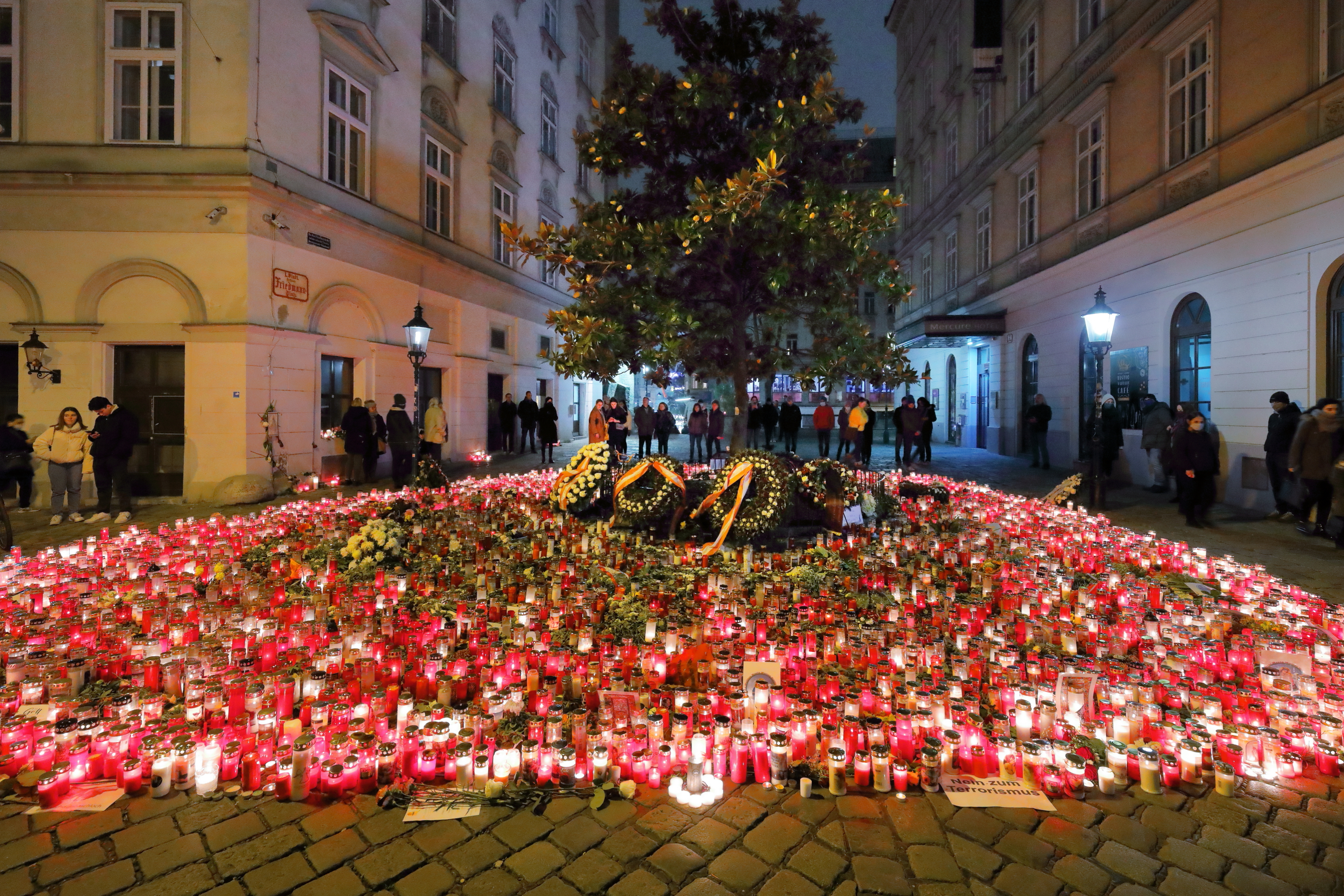
Memorial at Friedmann-Platz

A large police deployment took place in Vienna right after the attack, and members of EKO Cobra and WEGA were brought in to hunt for the perpetrators. Vienna police said that special forces entered the gunman's apartment using explosives, and a search of its surroundings was underway on 3 November. The Austrian Federal Army was deployed to secure buildings in Vienna. Roadblocks were set up around the city center. Enhanced checks were instituted at the nearby Czech border.

After a few hours, people were evacuated from nearby restaurants, bars, the Vienna State Opera, and the Burgtheater. The Viennese police asked pedestrians to avoid open spaces and public transport in the area, and then halted all trams and subways in central Vienna and asked people to shelter in place.

All synagogues, Jewish schools, institutions of the Jewish Community of Vienna, and kosher restaurants and supermarkets were closed the following day as a precaution after concerns were raised that the main synagogue had been the target. Although soon after the attack it became clear that the target had been the general population, not the synagogue, which had been closed and empty at the time.

On 6 November, authorities decided that two mosques in Ottakring (German: Melit-Ibrahim-Moschee) and Meidling (German: Tewhid-Moschee) would be closed because "a positive attitude towards society and state" as a legal precondition was not fulfilled by the mosques. The mosques had reportedly contributed to the radicalization of the attacker and they were reportedly frequented by him and other Islamists. The Melit-Ibrahim-Moschee had previously reportedly been frequented by Islamist Mohamed M. and an Islamic State supporter who was subsequently jailed.

On 11 November, the Islamic cemetery in Wien-Liesing on the outskirts of Vienna refused to allow the attacker to be buried there, as did another Muslim cemetery in Austria.

== See also ==
- List of terrorist incidents in 2020
- List of terrorist incidents linked to ISIL
- List of Islamist terrorist attacks
- 2024 Vienna terrorism plot
- 2015 Graz car attack
- 2025 Villach stabbing attack
- 2025 Graz school shooting
