= Federal Office for the Protection of the Constitution and Counterterrorism =

Austrian police organization

- Bundesamt für Verfassungsschutz und Terrorismusbekämpfung

Agency overview
- Formed: 2002; 24 years ago
- Dissolved: 2021; 5 years ago
- Superseding agency: Directorate State Protection and Intelligence Service
- Jurisdiction: Austrian Federal Government
- Headquarters: Rennweg 89-93, Landstraße, Vienna
- Agency executive: Johannes Freiseisen, Director
- Parent agency: Directorate General for Public Security (GDföS)
- Website: http://www.bvt.gv.at

The Federal Office for the Protection of the Constitution and Counterterrorism (Bundesamt für Verfassungsschutz und Terrorismusbekämpfung, "BVT") was an Austrian police organization that acted as a domestic intelligence agency. It was tasked with the protection of the constitutional organs of the Republic of Austria and their ability to function. The agency was created from the Austrian State police, as well as various special task forces targeting organized crime and terrorism that were under the direction of the Directorate General for Public Security (Generaldirektion für die öffentliche Sicherheit, "GDföS"), which itself is a department of the Federal Ministry of the Interior. The BVT published the Verfassungsschutzbericht, an annual report on the status of the protection of the constitution.

In late 2021, following criticism for perceived failures in preventing the 2020 Vienna attack, the BVT was dissolved and replaced with the new Directorate State Protection and Intelligence Service (DSN).

== History ==
The BVT was created in 2002 through the reorganization of various special task forces of the Federal Ministry of the Interior and the former state police. This was undertaken as a reaction to a perceived danger to public security caused by an increase in international terrorism. In the wake of the September 11 attacks, Federal Minister of the Interior Ernst Strasser ordered the restructuring of Austrian counterterrorism efforts.

Gert-René Polli, an officer of the Heeresnachrichtenamt, was named director. After Polli's resignation in October 2007, Peter Gridling, a former director of an Austrian counterterrorism task force, was named his successor.

On February 28, 2018, the BVT was raided by Austrian Federal Police under orders of prosecutors acting on an anti-corruption investigation, taking sensitive info on far-right groups known to be close to the FPÖ. Peter Gridling was suspended from duty when the raids occurred.

In the aftermath of the 2020 Vienna attack, Erich Zwettler was suspended from his work with the BVT and the organization was replaced by the new DSN. According to a Vienna-based European diplomat, the BVT was "so compromised that for a time it was cut out of much European intelligence sharing activity," allegedly by Russian intelligence agents. An Austrian official stated that they were implementing wide reform of its security agencies.

Two years after the dissolution of the BVT in 2023, it became public that in 2015, BVT agents sought residence and asylum in Austria for a Syrian general who was alleged to have committed crimes in the Syrian civil war. This is said to have happened under pressure from the Israeli Mossad, after the general defected to the Free Syrian Army.

== Organization ==
The legal basis for the BVT was the Sicherheitspolizeigesetz ("Federal Security Police Act"). The BVT existed as a federal office with nine bureaus, one in each of the nine states of Austria, generally located alongside the state police in the capital of each respective state.

For oversight of the BVT, the Austrian National Council created a standing subcommittee for internal affairs.
