= Directorate State Protection and Intelligence Service =

Austrian Government Intelligence Service

- Direktion Staatsschutz und Nachrichtendienst

Agency overview
- Formed: 2021; 5 years ago
- Preceding agency: Federal Office for the Protection of the Constitution and Counterterrorism
- Jurisdiction: Austrian Federal Government
- Headquarters: Herrengasse 7, Innere Stadt, Vienna
- Agency executive: Sylvia Mayer, Director
- Parent agency: Directorate General for Public Security (GDföS)
- Website: https://www.dsn.gv.at

The Directorate State Protection and Intelligence Service (DSN) is an Austrian state security and intelligence organization. It reports to the Directorate General for Public Security in the Federal Ministry of the Interior (BMI). Since 1 December 2021, it has been the successor organization to the Federal Office for the Protection of the Constitution and Counterterrorism (BVT).

== History ==
In September 2021, it was announced that Omar Haijawi-Pirchner had been appointed head of the new directorate. He took office at the same time as the directorate was established on December 1, 2021. David Blum, who previously worked at the BVT and the Federal Chancellery, and Michael Lohnegger (Head of the State Security Division), who was also recently appointed Head of Division at the BVT, were selected as deputies.

At the end of January 2023, David Blum left the DSN to work in the private sector. He was succeeded by Sylvia Mayer as Deputy Director of the Intelligence Service in October 2023.

Michael Lohnegger left the DSN on June 1, 2024. Since July 2025, Leopold Holzbauer, who previously served as Commander of the Schwechat City Police since 2012, has headed the State Security Division as Deputy Director of the DSN.

Since the beginning of 2026, Sylvia Mayer has been the first female director of the DSN, succeeding Omar Haijawi-Pirchner.

== Organization ==
It is divided into the areas of threat research and threat prevention. From a police perspective, state security is dedicated to the preventive protection of attacks that threaten the constitution (State Protection and Intelligence Service Act), threat research (Security Police Act) and the investigation of criminal offenses (Criminal Procedure Code 1975). The intelligence service is responsible for gathering and analyzing information and for extended threat investigation.
