= Outline of Austria =

Landlocked country in Central Europe

The flag of Austria

The Coat of arms of Austria

The location of Austria

Flag-map of Austria

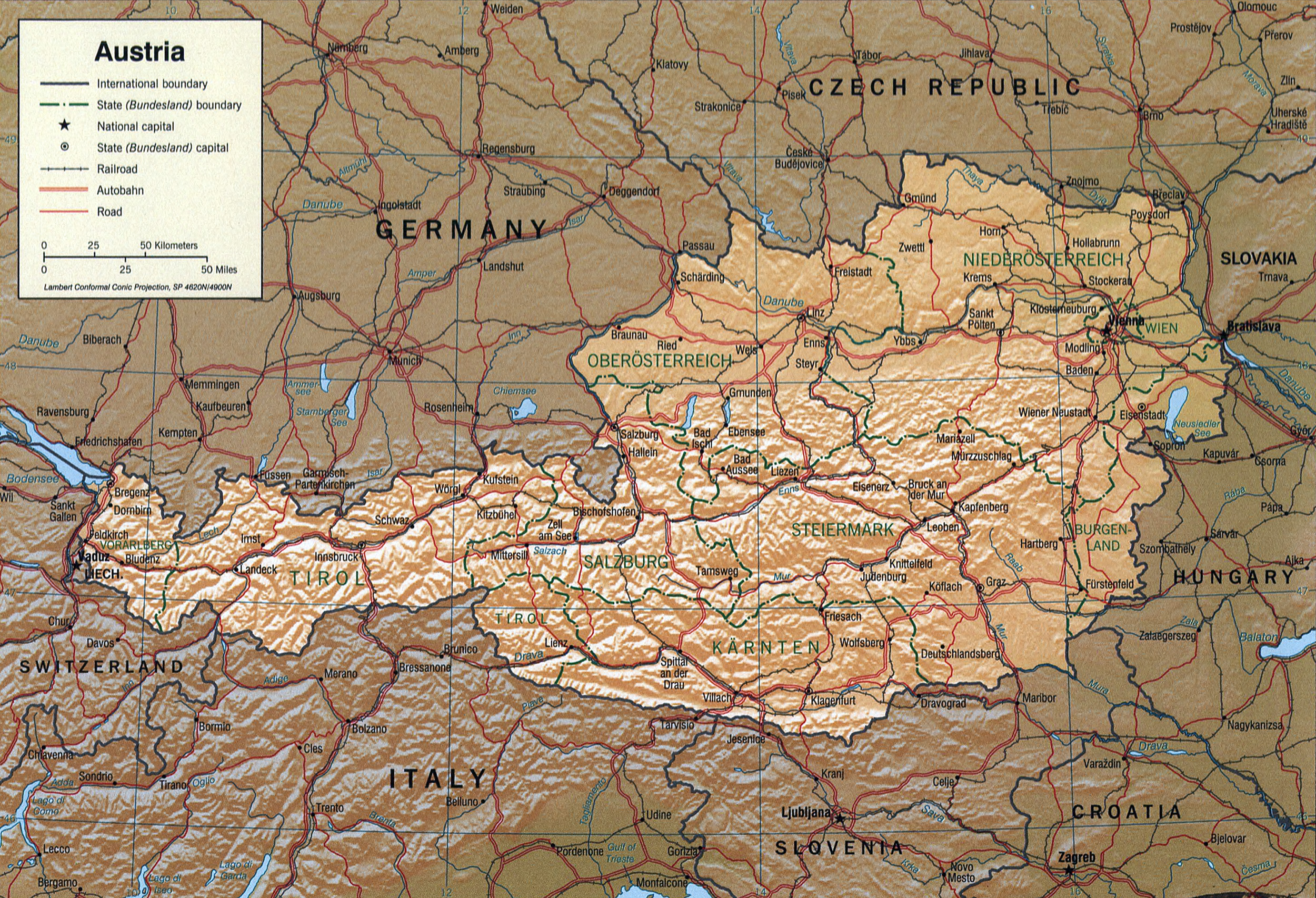
An enlargeable relief map of Austria

The following outline is provided as an overview of and topical guide to Austria:

Austria, formally the Republic of Austria, is a landlocked country in Central Europe, lying in the Eastern Alps. It is a federation of nine states, of which the capital Vienna is the most populous city and state. Austria is bordered by Germany to the northwest, the Czech Republic to the north, Slovakia to the northeast, Hungary to the east, Slovenia and Italy to the south, and Switzerland and Liechtenstein to the west. The country occupies an area of 83,879 km^{2} (32,386 sq mi) and has a population of about 9.2 million.

== General reference ==
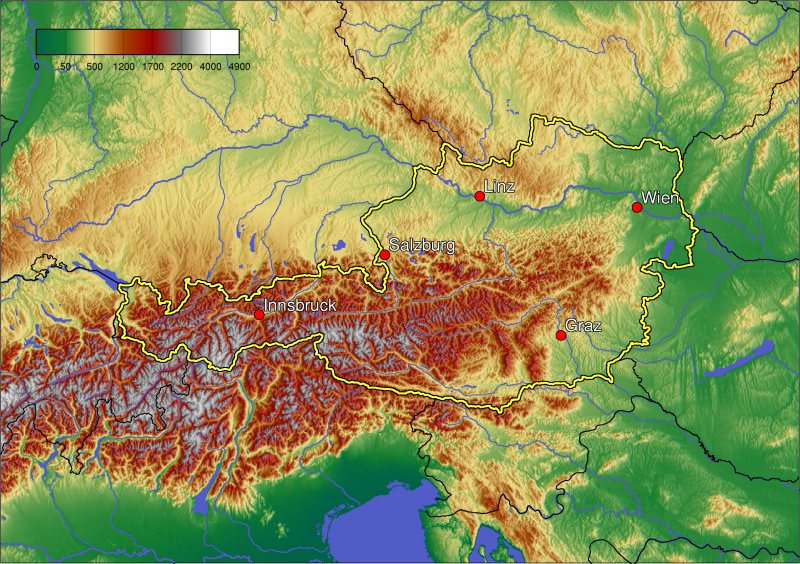
An enlargeable topographic map of Austria

- Pronunciation: /ˈɒstriə/ or /ˈɔːstriə/
- Common English country name: Austria
- Official English country name: The Republic of Austria
- Common endonym(s):
- Official endonym(s):
- Adjectival(s): Austrian
- Demonym(s):
- Etymology: Name of Austria
- ISO country codes: AT, AUT, 040
- ISO region codes: See ISO 3166-2:AT
- Internet country code top-level domain: .at

== Geography of Austria ==
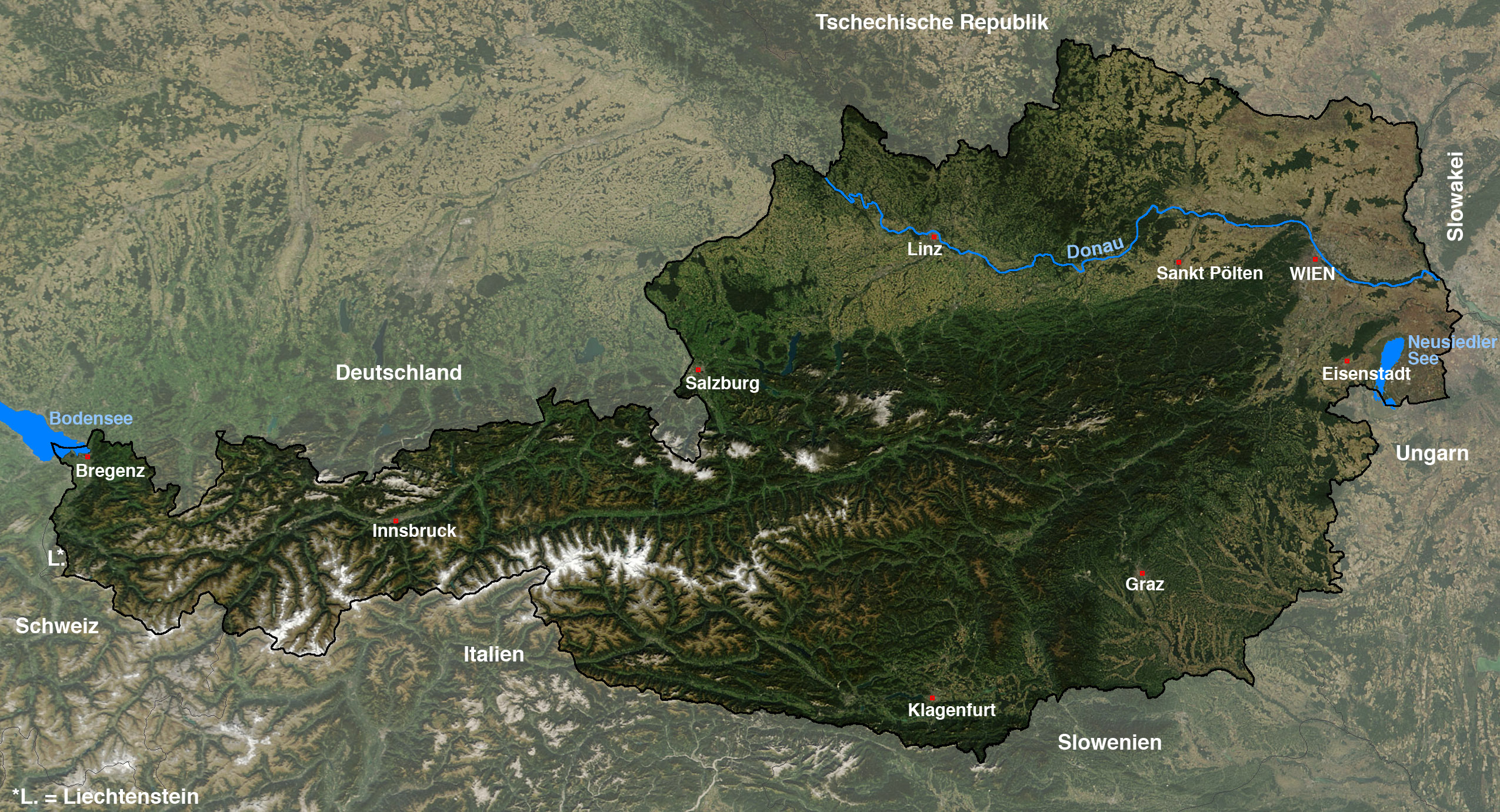
An enlargeable satellite map of Austria

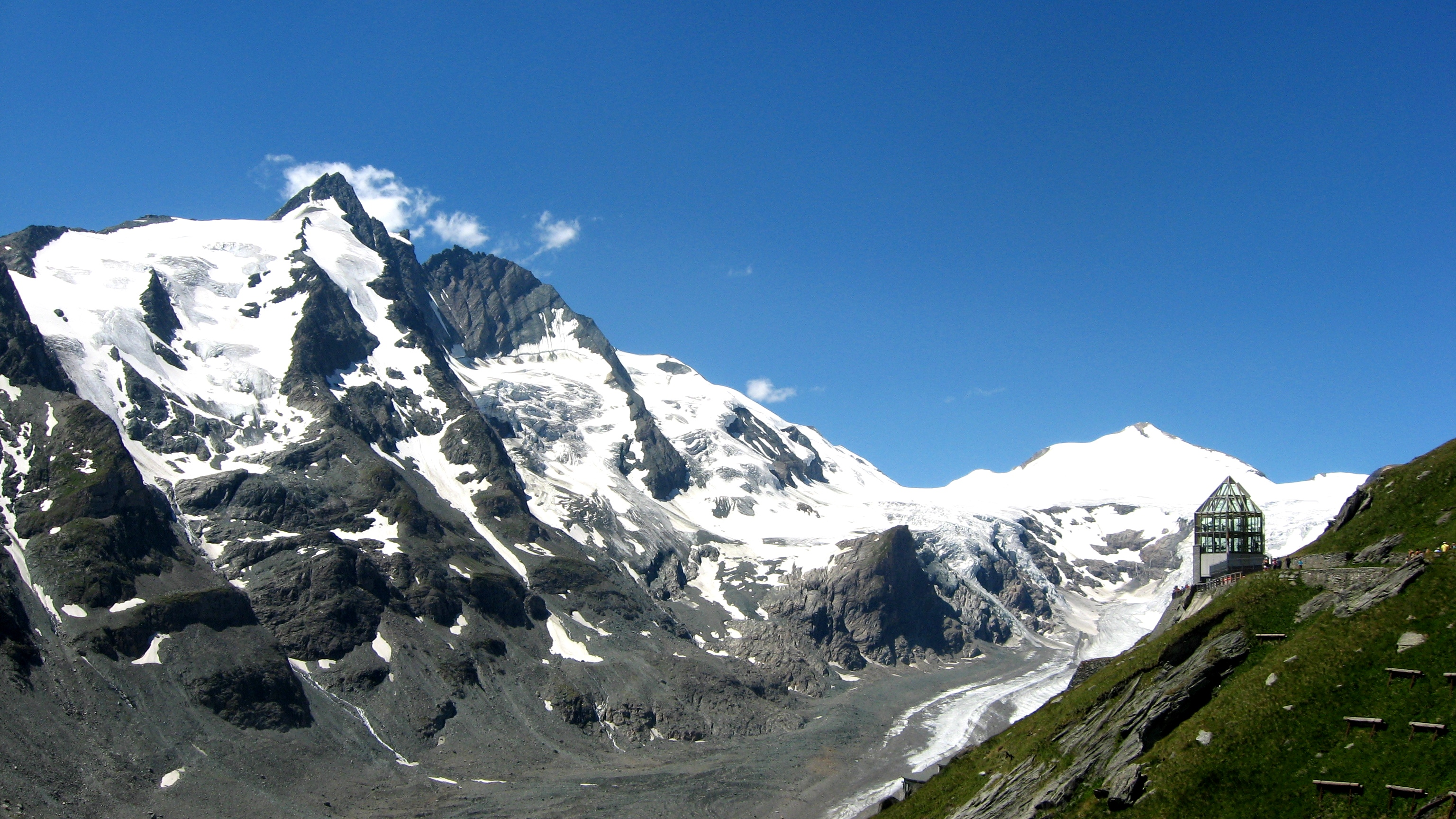
Grossglockner is, at 3,798 metres above the Adriatic (12,461 ft), the highest mountain in Austria

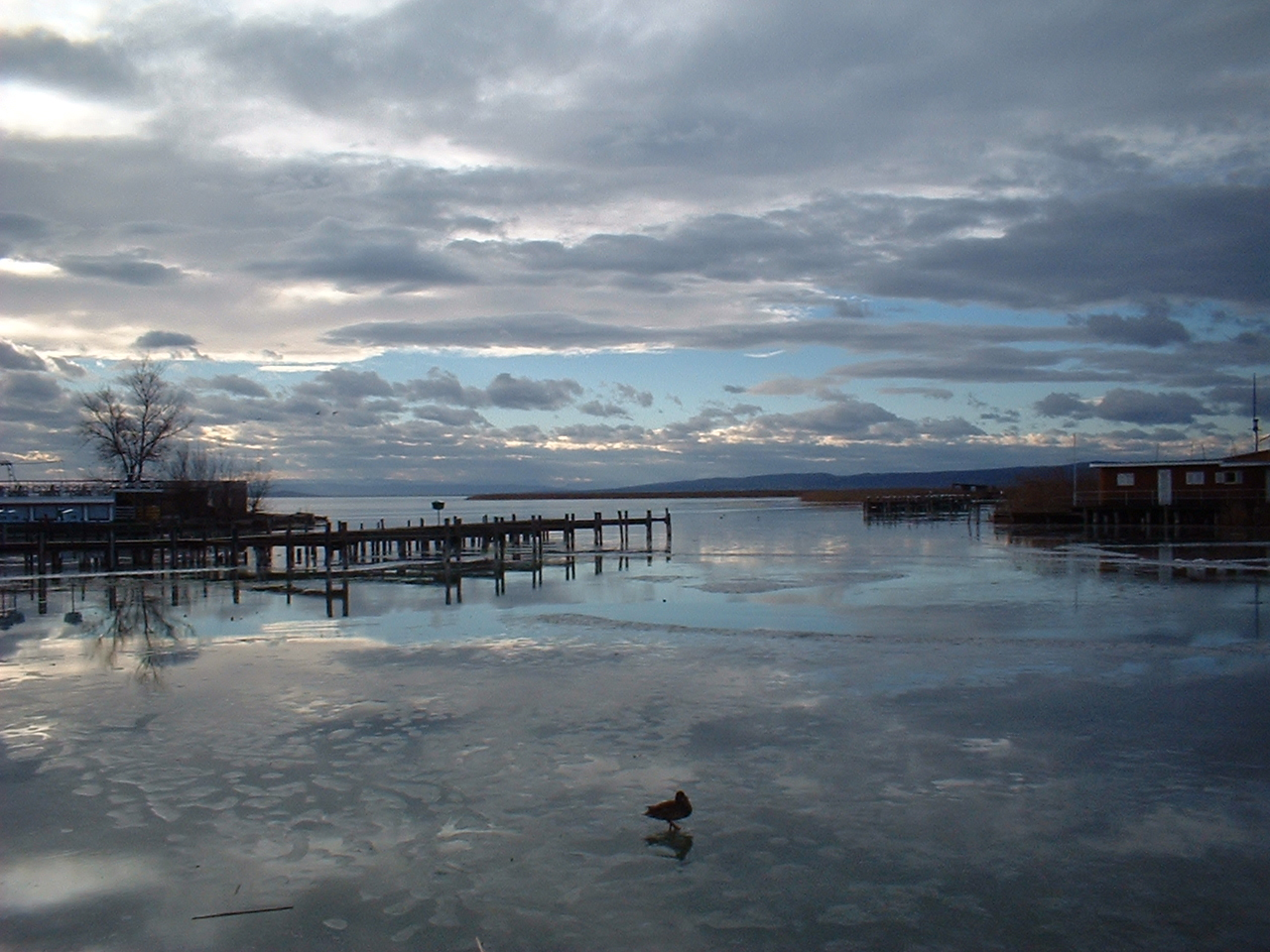
Lake Neusiedl, at 115 m (377 ft), the lowest point in Austria

- Austria is a:
  - Country
    - Developed country
    - Landlocked country
  - Sovereign state
    - Member State of the European Union
- Location:
  - Northern Hemisphere and Eastern Hemisphere
  - Eurasia
    - Europe
      - Central Europe
  - Time zone: Central European Time (UTC+01), Central European Summer Time (UTC+02)
  - Extreme points of Austria
    - High: Großglockner 3,798 m (12,461 ft)
    - Low: Lake Neusiedl 115 m (377 ft)

Land boundaries: 2,562 km

Germany 784 km
Italy 430 km
Hungary 366 km
Czech Republic 362 km
Slovenia 330 km
Switzerland 164 km
Slovakia 91 km
Liechtenstein 35 km

- Coastline: none

- Population of Austria: 8,316,487 people (2006 estimate) - 97th most populous country
- Area of Austria: 83,872 km^{2} (32,383 mi^{2}) - 115th largest country
- Atlas of Austria

=== Environment of Austria ===
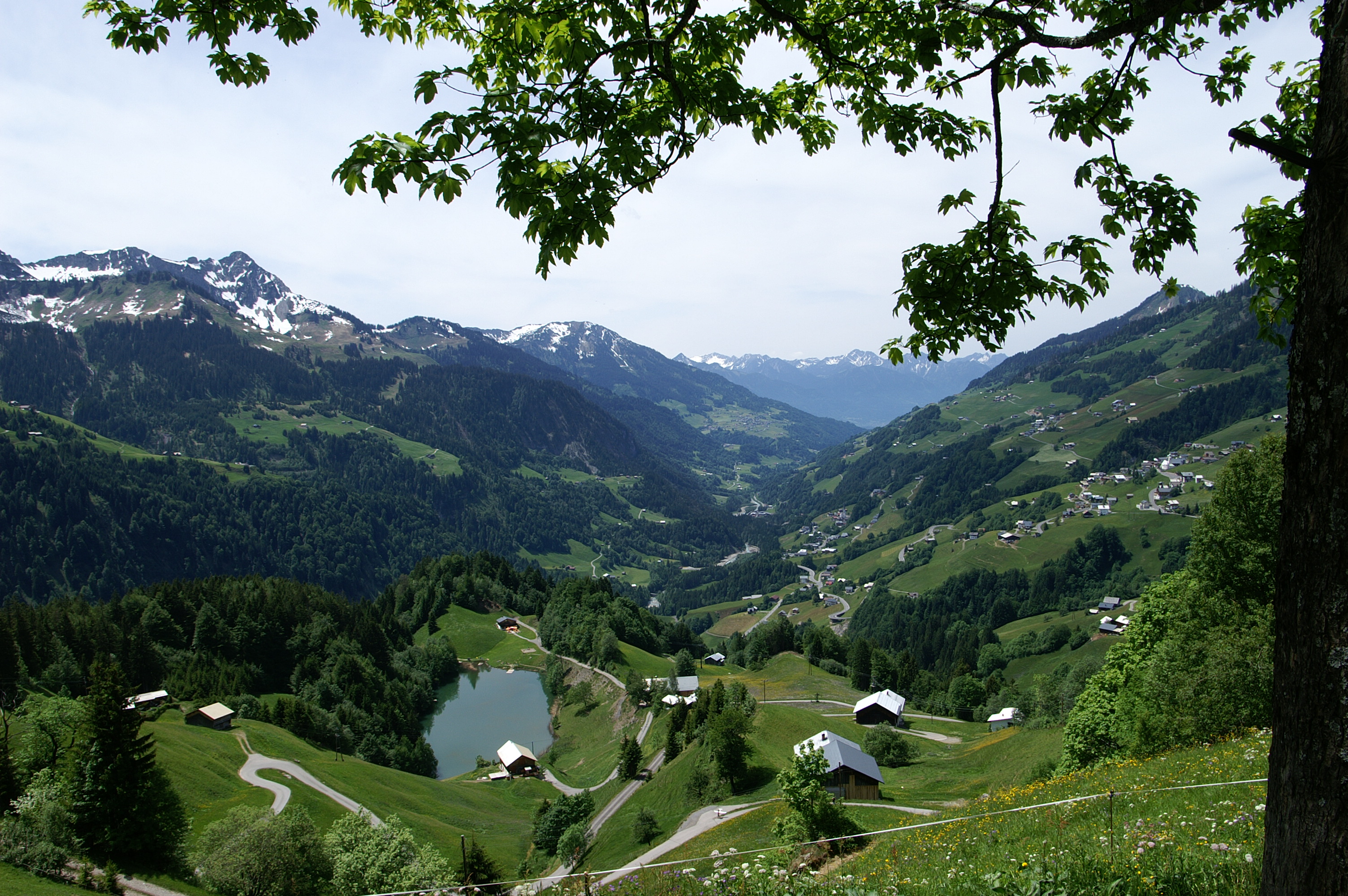
The Great Walser Valley

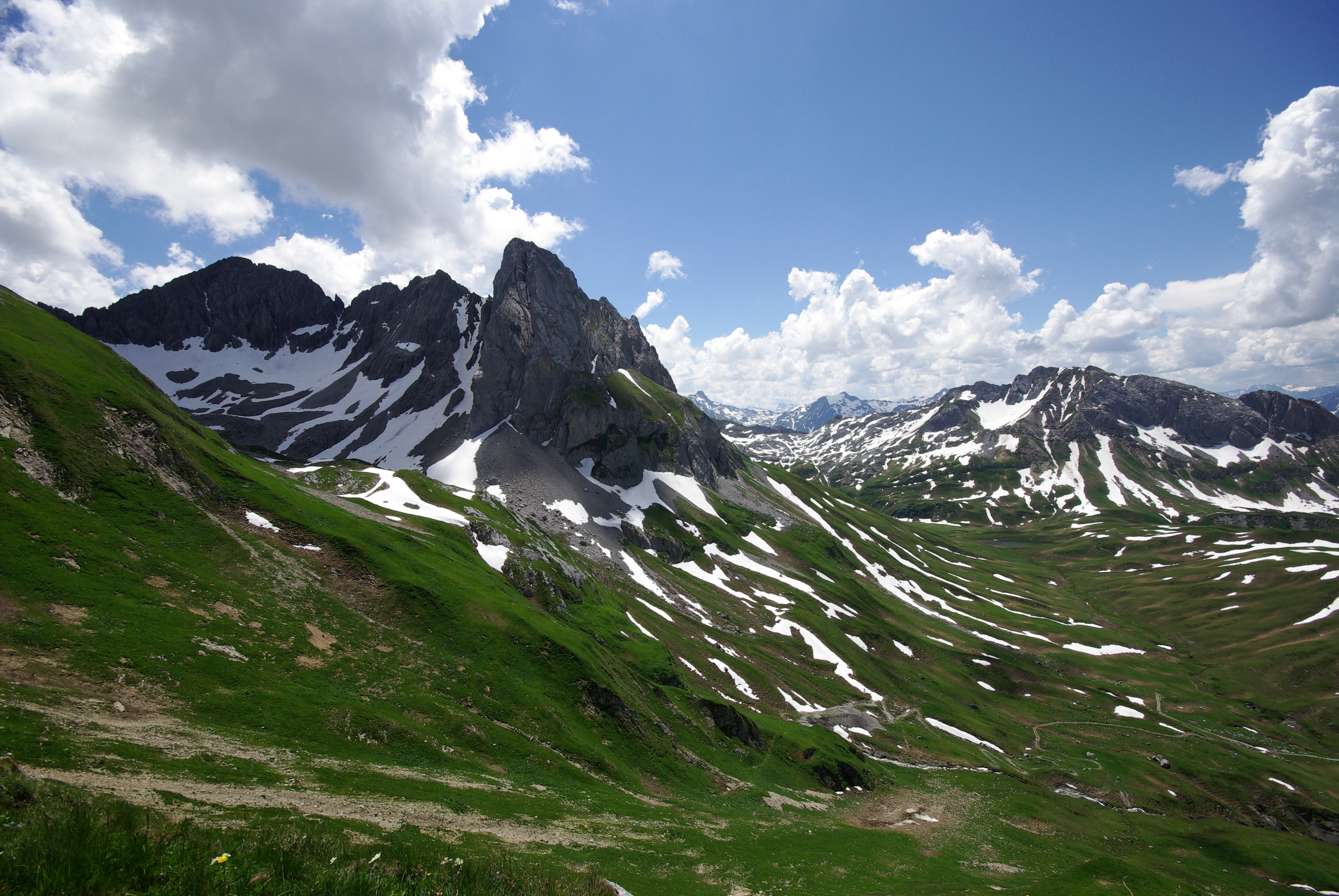
The Untere Wildgrubenspitze, the highest peak of the Lechquellen Mountains in Austria

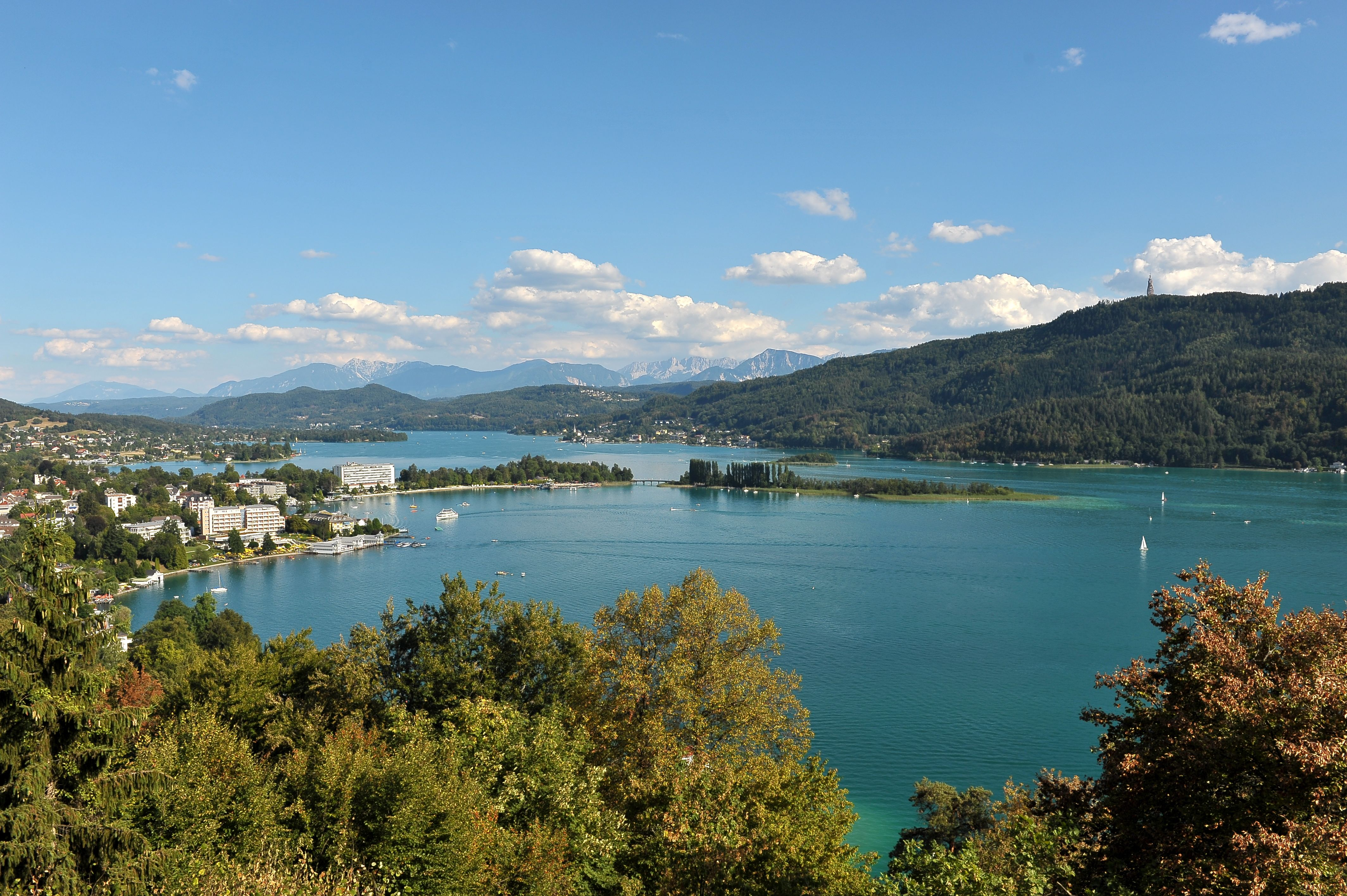
Wörthersee, Carinthia's largest lake

- Climate of Austria
- Environmental issues in Austria
- Renewable energy in Austria
- Geology of Austria
- Protected areas of Austria
  - Biosphere reserves in Austria
  - National parks of Austria
- Wildlife of Austria
  - Fauna of Austria
    - Birds of Austria
    - Mammals of Austria

==== Natural geographic features of Austria ====
- Glaciers of Austria
- Lakes of Austria
- Mountains of Austria
  - Volcanoes in Austria
- Rivers of Austria
  - Waterfalls of Austria
- Valleys of Austria
- List of World Heritage Sites in Austria

==== Neighbors of Austria ====
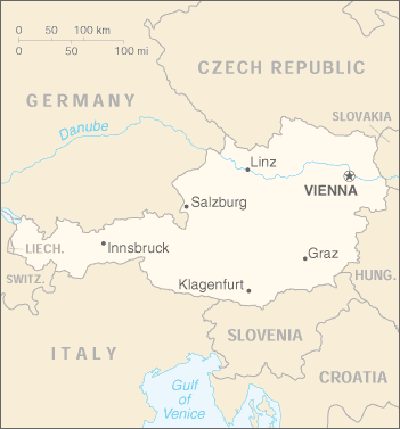
Map showing Austria and its neighbors

Austria is bordered by:

- Germany
- Czech Republic
- Slovakia
- Hungary
- Slovenia
- Italy
- Liechtenstein
- Switzerland

=== Regions of Austria ===
==== Administrative divisions of Austria ====
Administrative divisions of Austria

- States of Austria
  - Districts of Austria
    - Municipalities of Austria
  - Statutory cities (Statutarstädte)

States of Austria Österreichs Länder / Bundesländer (German)

States of Austria

- Burgenland
- Carinthia
- Lower Austria
- Upper Austria
- Salzburg
- Styria
- Tyrol
- Vorarlberg
- Vienna

The districts of Austria, listed by state:

Districts of Burgenland

Political district	Vehicle registration code	Administrative center	State
Eisenstadt-Umgebung	EU	Eisenstadt	Burgenland
Güssing (district)	GS	Güssing	Burgenland
Jennersdorf (district)	JE	Jennersdorf	Burgenland
Mattersburg (district)	MA	Mattersburg	Burgenland
Neusiedl am See (district)	ND	Neusiedl am See	Burgenland
Oberpullendorf (district)	OP	Oberpullendorf	Burgenland
Oberwart (district)	OW	Oberwart	Burgenland

Districts of Carinthia

Political district	Vehicle registration code	Administrative center	State
Feldkirchen (district)	FE	Feldkirchen in Kärnten	Carinthia
Hermagor	HE	Hermagor-Pressegger See	Carinthia
Klagenfurt-Land	KL	Klagenfurt	Carinthia
Sankt Veit an der Glan (district)	SV	Sankt Veit an der Glan	Carinthia
Spittal an der Drau (district)	SP	Spittal an der Drau	Carinthia
Villach-Land	VL	Villach	Carinthia
Völkermarkt (district)	VK	Völkermarkt	Carinthia
Wolfsberg (district)	WO	Wolfsberg	Carinthia

Districts of Lower Austria

Political district	Vehicle registration code	Administrative center	State
Amstetten (district)	AM	Amstetten	Lower Austria
Baden (district)	BN	Baden	Lower Austria
Bruck an der Leitha (district)	BL	Bruck an der Leitha	Lower Austria
Gänserndorf (district)	GF	Gänserndorf	Lower Austria
Gmünd (district)	GD	Gmünd	Lower Austria
Hollabrunn (district)	HL	Hollabrunn	Lower Austria
Horn (district)	HO	Horn	Lower Austria
Korneuburg (district)	KO	Korneuburg	Lower Austria
Krems-Land	KR	Krems an der Donau	Lower Austria
Lilienfeld (district)	LF	Lilienfeld	Lower Austria
Melk (district)	ME	Melk	Lower Austria
Mistelbach (district)	MI	Mistelbach	Lower Austria
Mödling (district)	MD	Mödling	Lower Austria
Neunkirchen (district)	NK	Neunkirchen	Lower Austria
Sankt Pölten-Land	PL	Sankt Pölten	Lower Austria
Scheibbs (district)	SB	Scheibbs	Lower Austria
Tulln (district)	TU	Tulln	Lower Austria
Waidhofen an der Thaya (district)	WT	Waidhofen an der Thaya	Lower Austria
Waidhofen an der Ybbs	WY	Waidhofen an der Ybbs	Lower Austria
Wiener Neustadt-Land	WB	Wiener Neustadt	Lower Austria
Wien-Umgebung	WU; SW for the city of Schwechat	Klosterneuburg	Lower Austria
Zwettl (district)	ZT	Zwettl	Lower Austria

Districts of Upper Austria

Political district	Vehicle registration code	Administrative center	State
Braunau am Inn (district)	BR	Braunau am Inn	Upper Austria
Eferding (district)	EF	Eferding	Upper Austria
Freistadt (district)	FR	Freistadt	Upper Austria
Gmunden (district)	GM	Gmunden	Upper Austria
Grieskirchen (district)	GR	Grieskirchen	Upper Austria
Kirchdorf an der Krems (district)	KI	Kirchdorf an der Krems	Upper Austria
Linz-Land	LL	Linz	Upper Austria
Perg (district)	PE	Perg	Upper Austria
Ried im Innkreis (district)	RI	Ried im Innkreis	Upper Austria
Rohrbach (district)	RO	Rohrbach im Mühlkreis	Upper Austria
Schärding (district)	SD	Schärding	Upper Austria
Steyr-Land	SE	Steyr	Upper Austria
Urfahr-Umgebung	UU	Linz	Upper Austria
Vöcklabruck (district)	VB	Vöcklabruck	Upper Austria
Wels-Land	WL	Wels	Upper Austria

Districts of Salzburg

Political district	Vehicle registration code	Administrative center	State
Hallein (district)	HA	Hallein	Salzburg
Salzburg-Umgebung	SL	Salzburg	Salzburg
Tamsweg (district)	TA	Tamsweg	Salzburg
Sankt Johann im Pongau (district)	JO	Sankt Johann im Pongau	Salzburg
Zell am See (district)	ZE	Zell am See	Salzburg

Districts of Styria

Political district	Vehicle registration code	Administrative center	State
Bruck-Mürzzuschlag	BM (MZ)	Bruck an der Mur	Styria
Deutschlandsberg (district)	DL	Deutschlandsberg	Styria
Graz-Umgebung	GU	Graz	Styria
Hartberg-Fürstenfeld	HF (FF, HB)	Hartberg	Styria
Leibnitz (district)	LB	Leibnitz	Styria
Leoben (district)	LN; LE for the city of Leoben	Leoben	Styria
Liezen (district)	LI, GB (BA)	Liezen	Styria
Murau (district)	MU	Murau	Styria
Murtal (district)	MT (JU, KF)	Judenburg	Styria
Südoststeiermark (district)	SO (FB, RA)	Feldbach	Styria
Voitsberg (district)	VO	Voitsberg	Styria
Weiz (district)	WZ	Weiz	Styria

Districts of Tyrol

Political district	Vehicle registration code	Administrative center	State
Imst (district)	IM	Imst	Tyrol
Innsbruck-Land	IL	Innsbruck	Tyrol
Kitzbühel (district)	KB	Kitzbühel	Tyrol
Kufstein (district)	KU	Kufstein	Tyrol
Landeck (district)	LA	Landeck	Tyrol
Lienz (district)	LZ	Lienz	Tyrol
Reutte (district)	RE	Reutte	Tyrol
Schwaz (district)	SZ	Schwaz	Tyrol

Districts of Vorarlberg

Political district	Vehicle registration code	Administrative center	State
Bludenz (district)	BZ	Bludenz	Vorarlberg
Bregenz (district)	B	Bregenz	Vorarlberg
Dornbirn (district)	DO	Dornbirn	Vorarlberg
Feldkirch (district)	FK	Feldkirch	Vorarlberg

Districts of Vienna

===== Municipalities of Austria =====
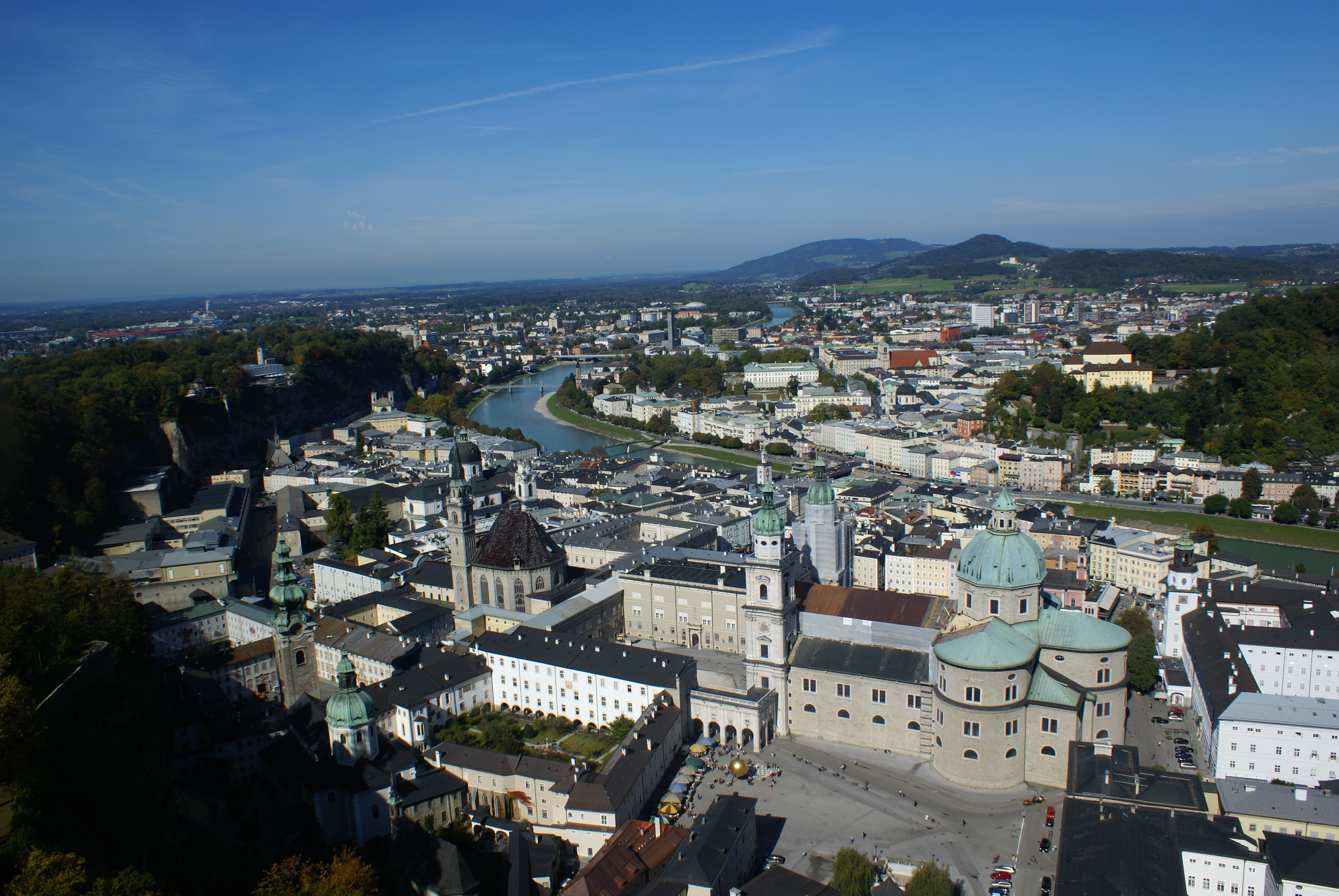
Salzburg, the fourth-largest city in Austria

Municipalities of Austria

- Cities and towns of Austria
  - Capital of Austria: Vienna (outline)

== Government and politics of Austria ==
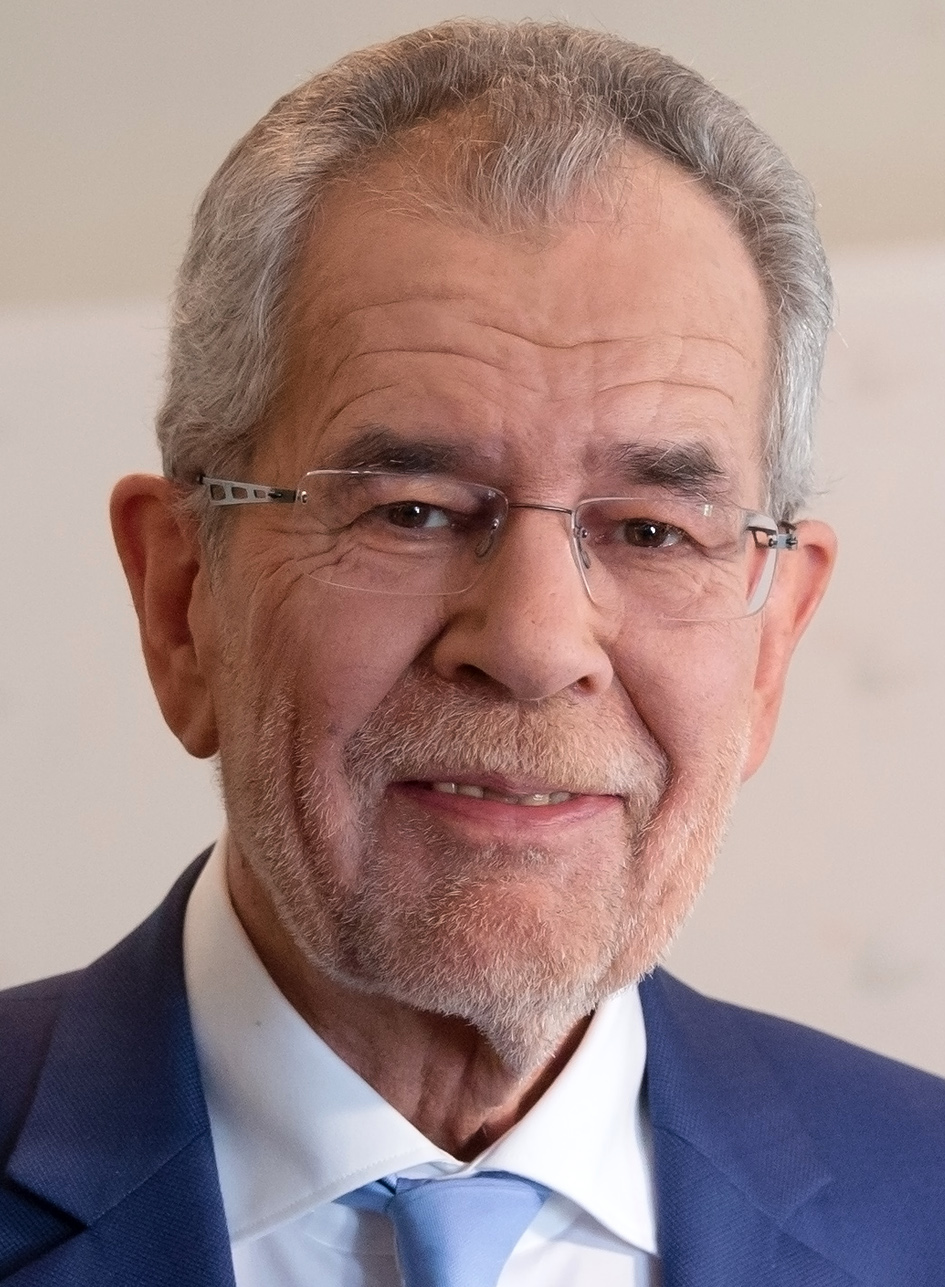
Alexander Van der Bellen, president of Austria.

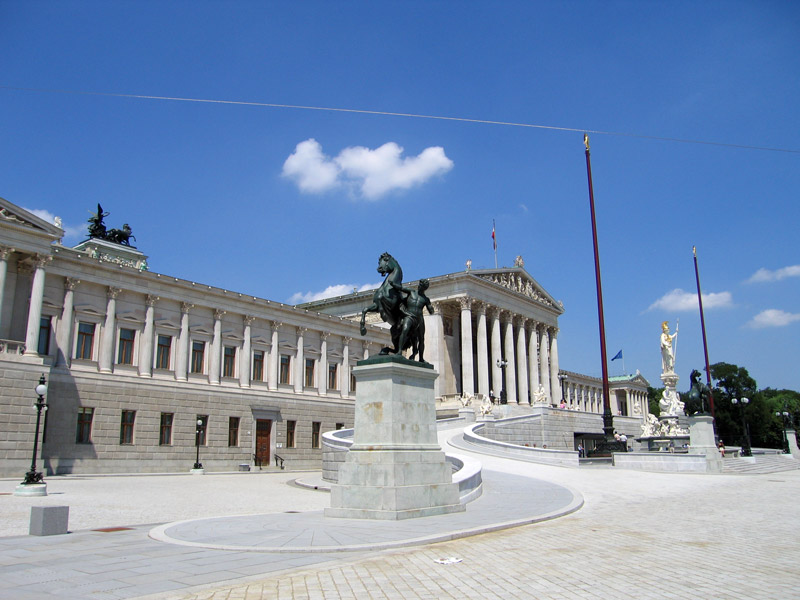
Parliament Building on Ringstraße, Vienna

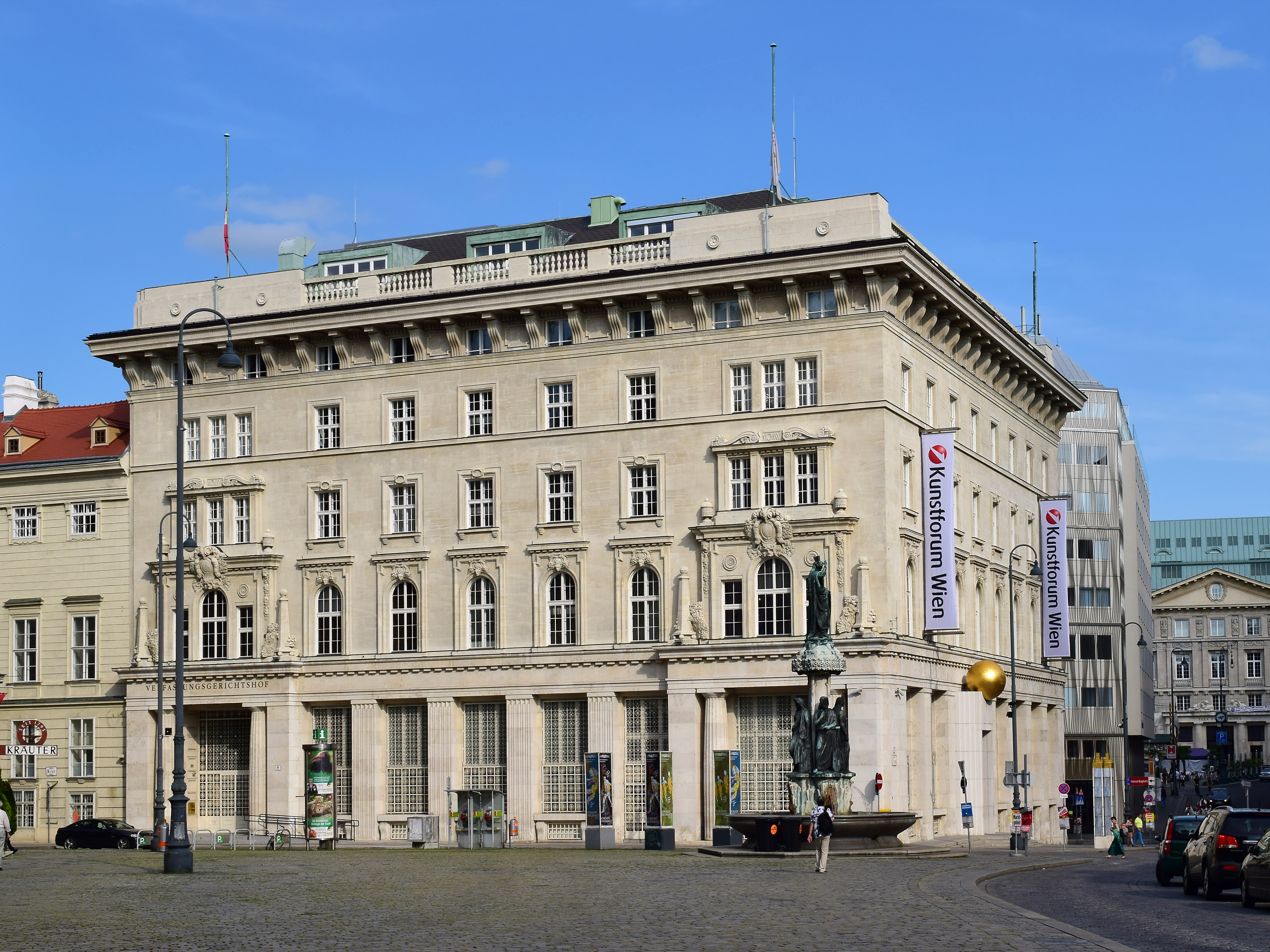
Seat of the Constitutional Court in Vienna

Politics of Austria

- Form of government: federal parliamentary representative democratic republic
- Capital of Austria: Vienna
- Elections in Austria
- Political parties in Austria
- Taxation in Austria

=== Branches of the government of Austria ===
Government of Austria

==== Executive branch of the government of Austria ====
Austrian Federal Government

- Head of state: President of Austria, Alexander Van der Bellen.
- Head of government: Chancellor of Austria, Sebastian Kurz.
  - Vice-Chancellor of Austria
- Cabinet of Austria

==== Legislative branch of the government of Austria ====
- Parliament of Austria (bicameral)
  - Upper house: National Council of Austria (Nationalrat)
  - Lower house: Federal Council of Austria (Bundesrat)

==== Judicial branch of the government of Austria ====
Courts in Austria

- Constitutional Court of Austria
- Administrative Court of Austria
- Criminal court system of Austria
- Civil court system of Austria

=== Foreign relations of Austria ===
Foreign relations of Austria

- Diplomatic missions in Austria
- Diplomatic missions of Austria

==== International organization membership ====
The Republic of Austria is a member of:

- African Development Bank Group (AfDB) (nonregional member)
- Asian Development Bank (ADB) (nonregional member)
- Australia Group
- Bank for International Settlements (BIS)
- Black Sea Economic Cooperation Zone (BSEC) (observer)
- Central European Initiative (CEI)
- Confederation of European Paper Industries (CEPI)
- Council of Europe (CE)
- Economic and Monetary Union (EMU)
- Euro-Atlantic Partnership Council (EAPC)
- European Bank for Reconstruction and Development (EBRD)
- European Investment Bank (EIB)
- European Organization for Nuclear Research (CERN)
- European Space Agency (ESA)
- European Union (EU)
- Food and Agriculture Organization (FAO)
- Group of 9 (G9)
- Inter-American Development Bank (IADB)
- International Atomic Energy Agency (IAEA)
- International Bank for Reconstruction and Development (IBRD)
- International Chamber of Commerce (ICC)
- International Civil Aviation Organization (ICAO)
- International Criminal Court (ICCt)
- International Criminal Police Organization (Interpol)
- International Development Association (IDA)
- International Energy Agency (IEA)
- International Federation of Red Cross and Red Crescent Societies (IFRCS)
- International Finance Corporation (IFC)
- International Fund for Agricultural Development (IFAD)
- International Labour Organization (ILO)
- International Maritime Organization (IMO)
- International Monetary Fund (IMF)
- International Olympic Committee (IOC)
- International Organization for Migration (IOM)
- International Organization for Standardization (ISO)
- International Red Cross and Red Crescent Movement (ICRM)
- International Telecommunication Union (ITU)
- International Telecommunications Satellite Organization (ITSO)
- International Trade Union Confederation (ITUC)
- Inter-Parliamentary Union (IPU)
- Multilateral Investment Guarantee Agency (MIGA)
- Nonaligned Movement (NAM) (guest)
- Nuclear Energy Agency (NEA)
- Nuclear Suppliers Group (NSG)
- Organisation internationale de la Francophonie (OIF) (observer)
- Organisation for Economic Co-operation and Development (OECD)
- Organization for Security and Cooperation in Europe (OSCE)
- Organisation for the Prohibition of Chemical Weapons (OPCW)
- Organization of American States (OAS) (observer)
- Paris Club
- Partnership for Peace (PFP)
- Permanent Court of Arbitration (PCA)
- Schengen Convention
- Southeast European Cooperative Initiative (SECI) (observer)
- United Nations (UN)
- United Nations Conference on Trade and Development (UNCTAD)
- United Nations Educational, Scientific, and Cultural Organization (UNESCO)
- United Nations High Commissioner for Refugees (UNHCR)
- United Nations Industrial Development Organization (UNIDO)
- United Nations Mission for the Referendum in Western Sahara (MINURSO)
- United Nations Observer Mission in Georgia (UNOMIG)
- United Nations Peacekeeping Force in Cyprus (UNFICYP)
- United Nations Truce Supervision Organization (UNTSO)
- Universal Postal Union (UPU)
- Western European Union (WEU) (observer)
- World Confederation of Labour (WCL)
- World Customs Organization (WCO)
- World Federation of Trade Unions (WFTU)
- World Health Organization (WHO)
- World Intellectual Property Organization (WIPO)
- World Meteorological Organization (WMO)
- World Tourism Organization (UNWTO)
- World Trade Organization (WTO)
- World Veterans Federation
- Zangger Committee (ZC)

=== Law and order in Austria ===
Law of Austria

- Animal rights in Austria
  - Animal welfare and rights in Austria
- Capital punishment in Austria
- Constitution of Austria
  - Federal Constitutional Law (Austrian act)
- Crime in Austria
  - Corruption in Austria
  - Human trafficking in Austria
- Human rights in Austria
  - Abortion in Austria
  - LGBT rights in Austria
  - Woman in Austria
  - Freedom of religion in Austria
- Law enforcement in Austria
  - Federal Police (Austria)
  - Financial Guard (Austria)
  - Gendarmerie (Austria)
  - Municipal police (Austria)

=== Military of Austria ===
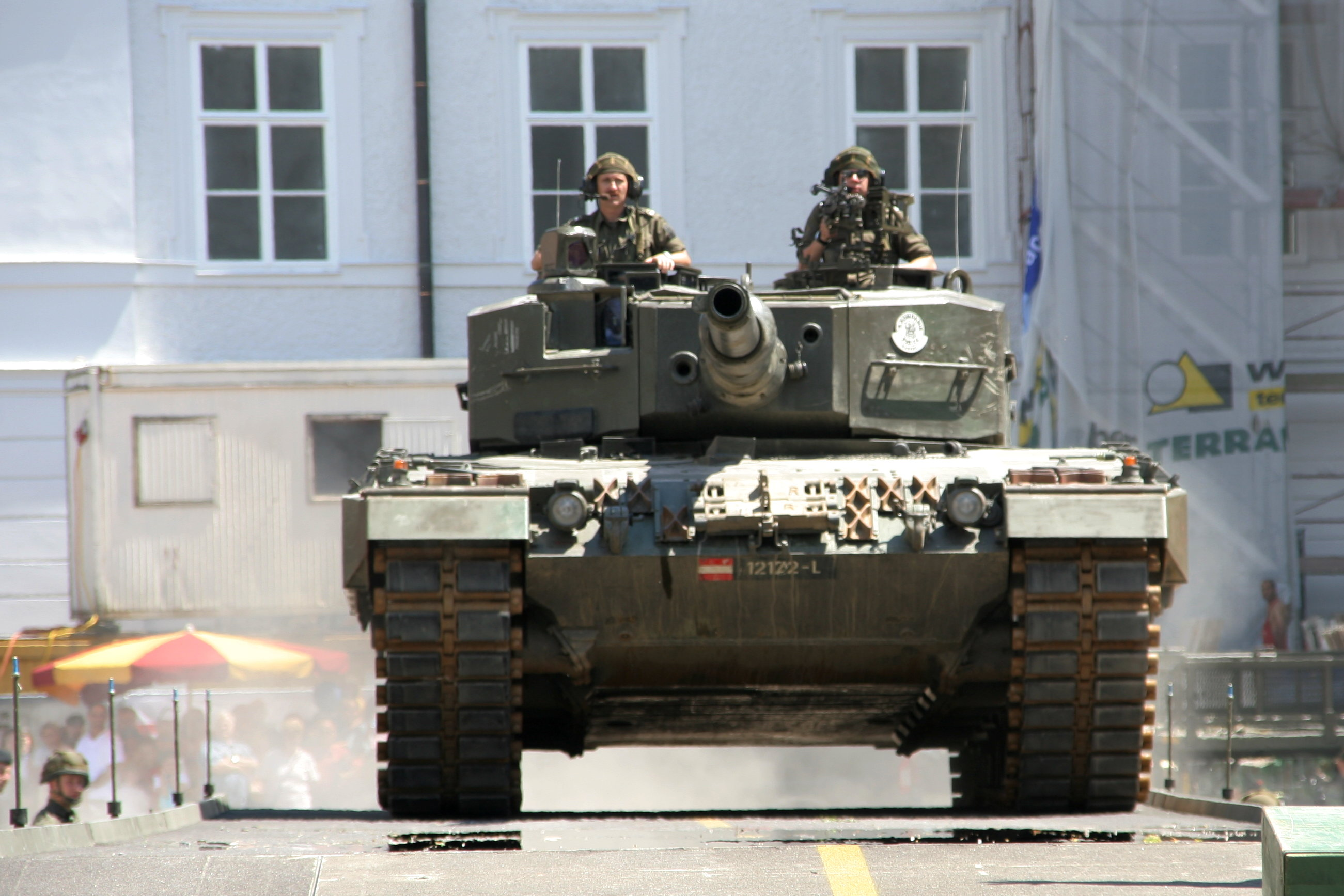
Leopard 2A4 of the Austrian Bundesheer

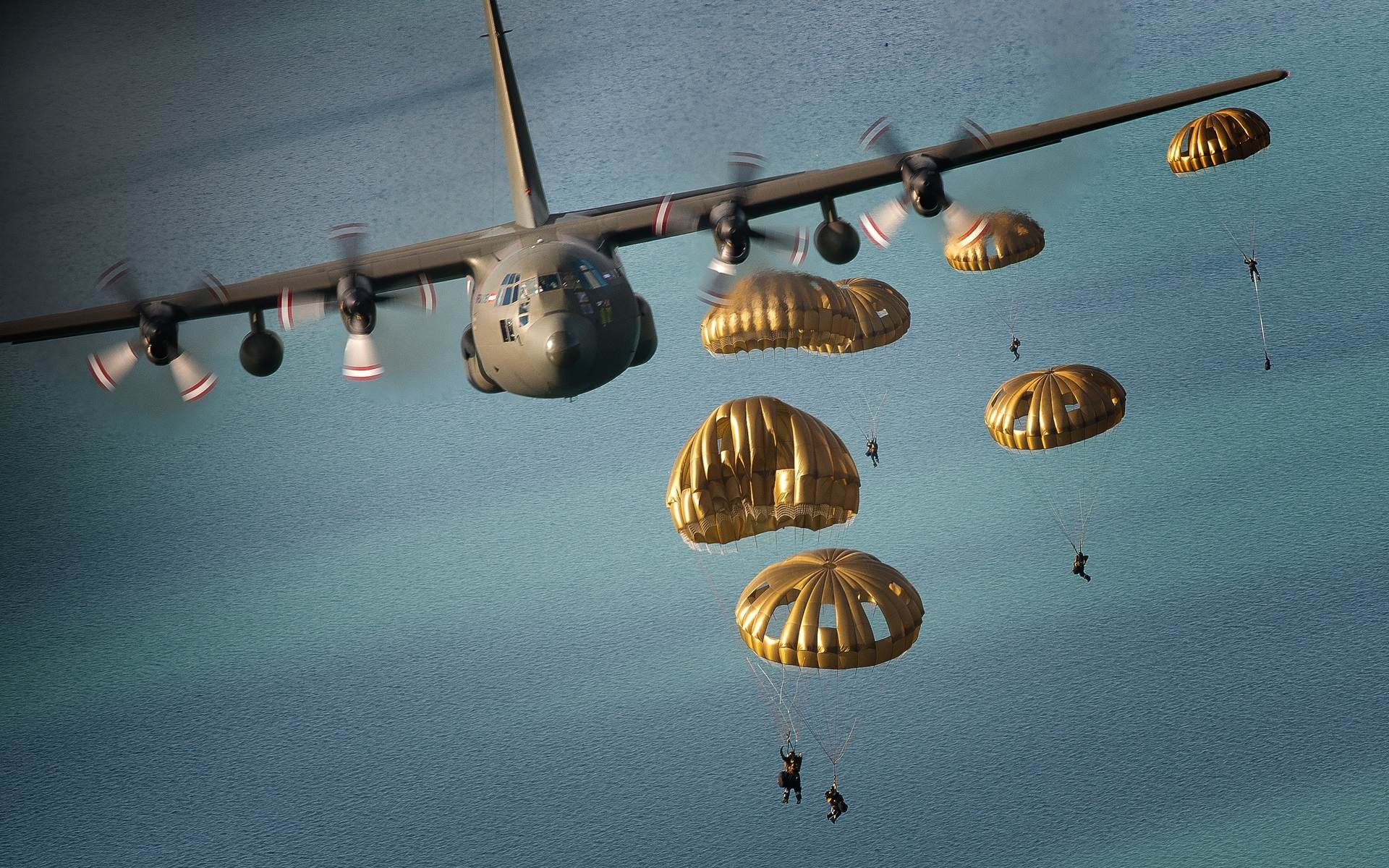
Jagdkommando soldiers jump out of the C-130 Hercules

Military of Austria

- Command
  - Commander-in-chief: President of Austria, Heinz Fischer
    - Ministry of Defence of Austria
- Forces
  - Army of Austria
  - Navy of Austria: None
  - Air Force of Austria
  - Special forces of Austria
- Military history of Austria
- Military ranks of Austria

=== Local government in Austria ===
Local government in Austria

- Government of Burgenland
- Government of Carinthia
- Government of Lower Austria
- Government of Upper Austria
- Government of Salzburg
- Government of Styria
- Government of Tyrol
- Government of Vorarlberg
- Government of Vienna

== History of Austria ==
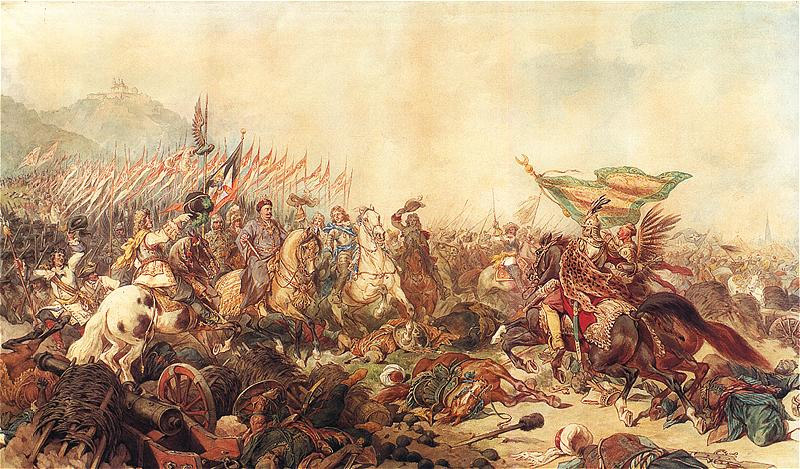
Battle of Vienna 1683

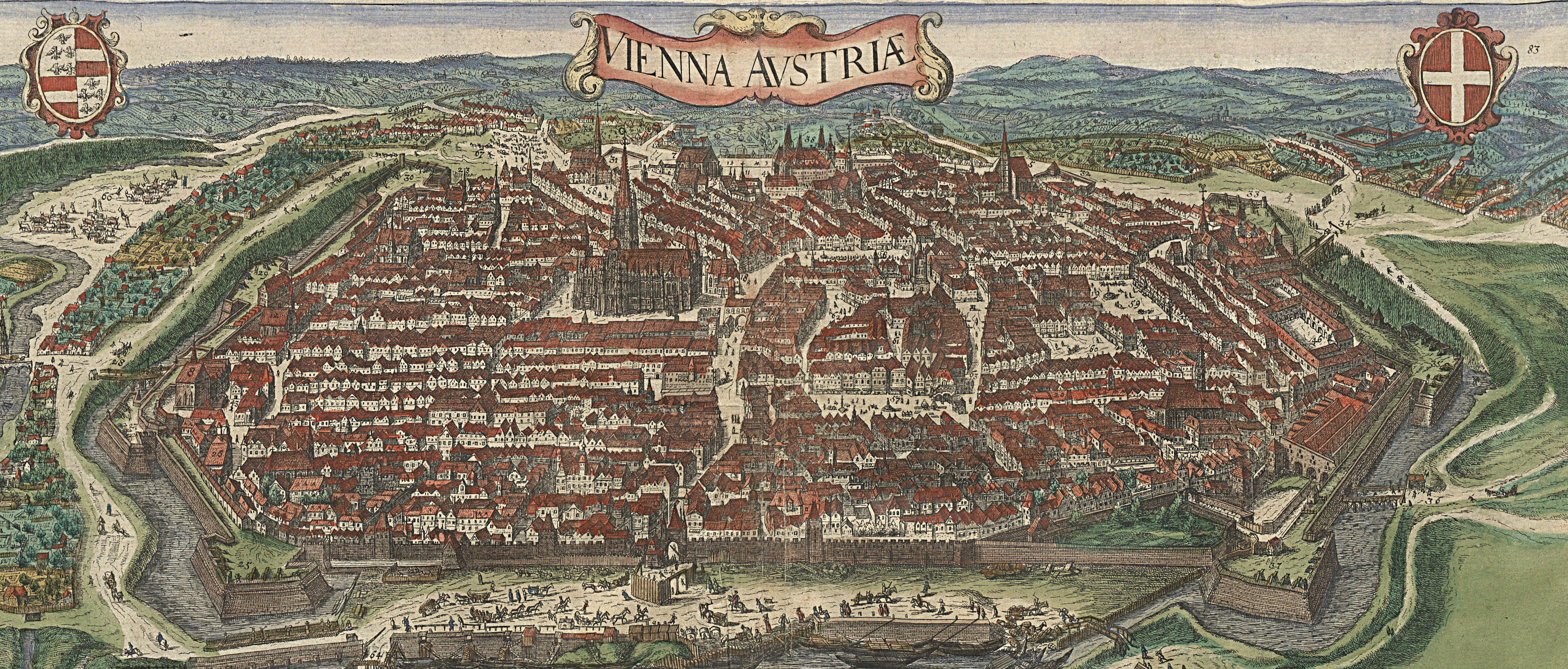
Panoramic view of Vienna after the city walls were reconstructed in 1548. In the middle is St. Stephen's Cathedral, behind the medieval Hofburg complex

- Timeline of Austrian history
- Current events of Austria
- Military history of Austria
- Rulers of Austria

=== By state ===
- History of Burgenland
- History of Carinthia
- History of Lower Austria
- History of Upper Austria
- History of Salzburg
- History of Styria
- History of Tyrol
- History of Vorarlberg
- History of Vienna

== Culture of Austria ==
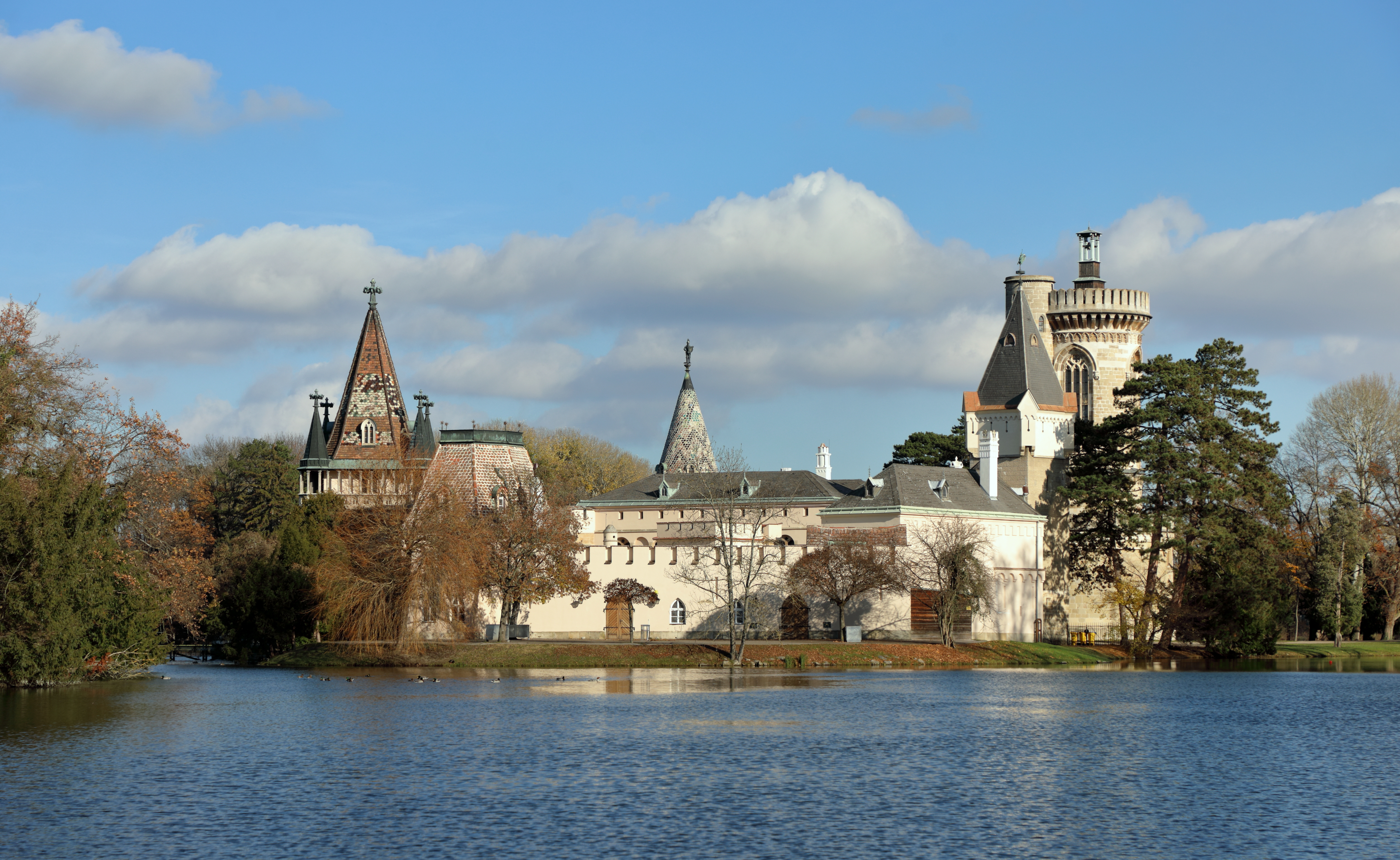
Franzensburg castle in Laxenburg

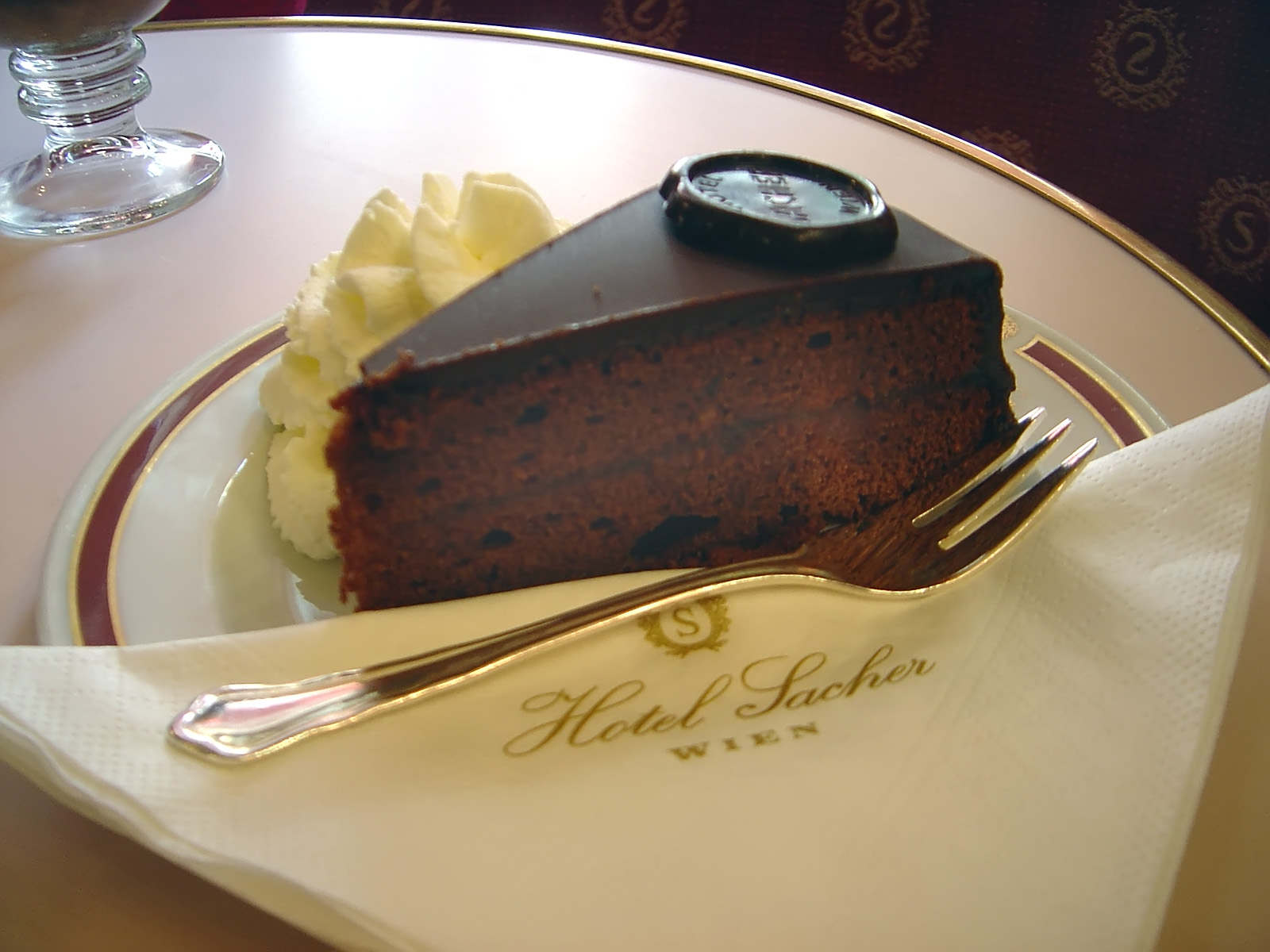
The original Sachertorte, as served at Vienna's Hotel Sacher

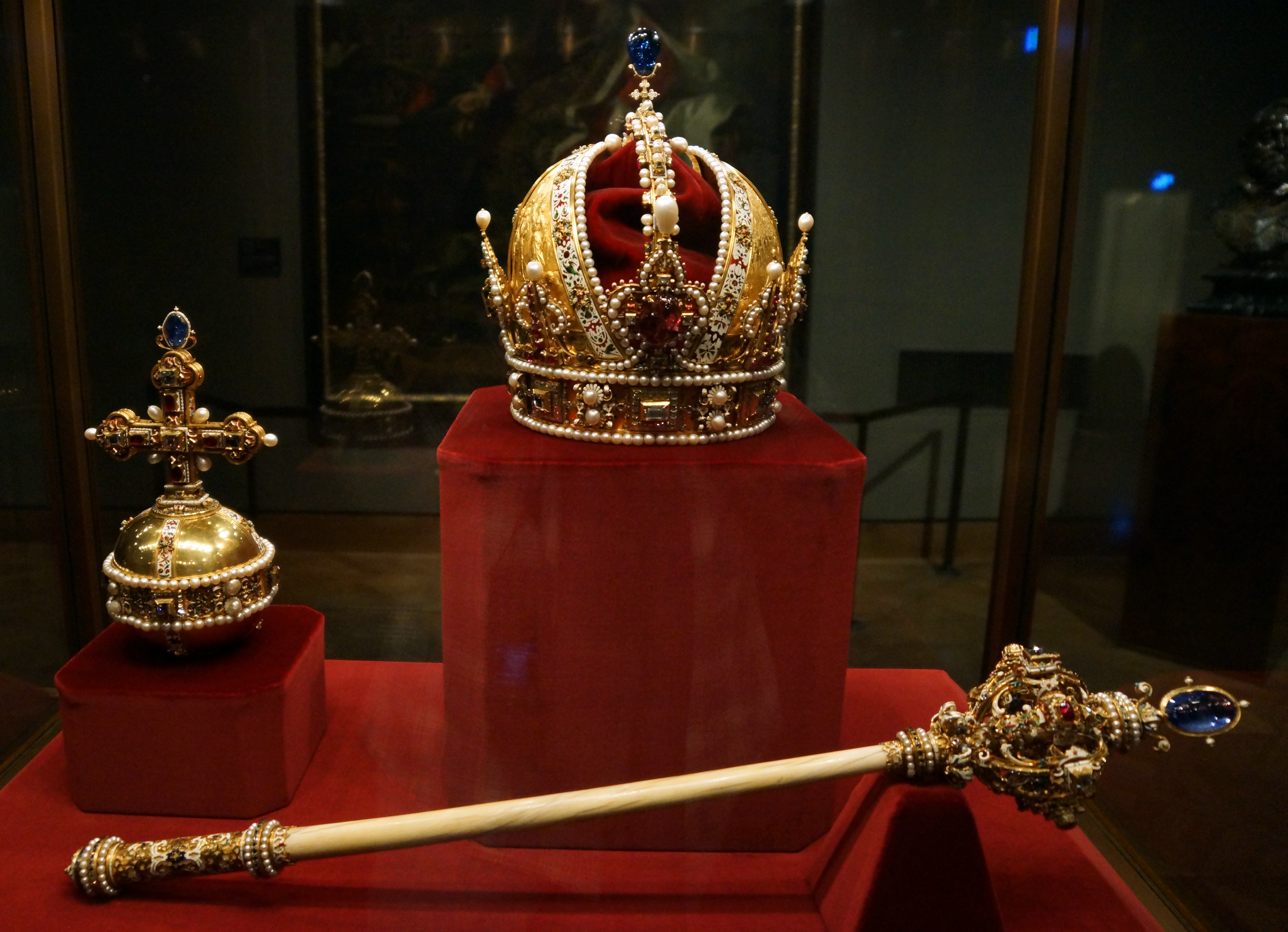
Austrian Crown Jewels: Imperial Orb, Crown, and Sceptre

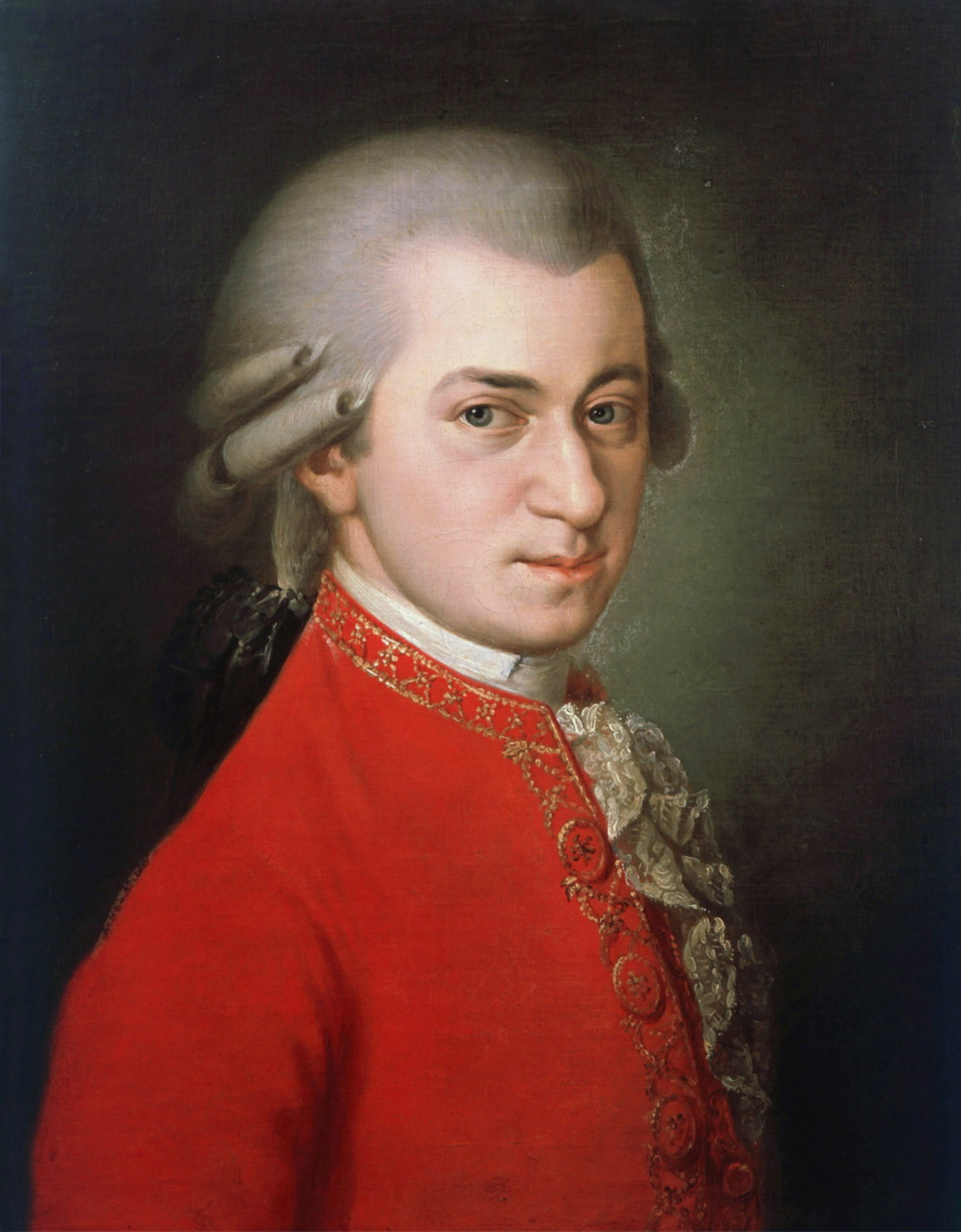
Posthumous painting of Wolfgang Amadeus Mozart (1819)

- Architecture of Austria
  - Austrian architects
- Austrophile
- Cuisine of Austria
  - Austrian wine
  - Beer in Austria
- Festivals in Austria
- Folk dance
- Languages of Austria
  - Minority languages of Austria
- Media in Austria
  - Newspapers
  - Radio in Austria
  - Television in Austria
- National symbols of Austria
  - Coat of arms of Austria
  - Flag of Austria
  - National anthem of Austria
  - Honours system of Austria
- People of Austria
  - List of Austrians
- Prostitution in Austria
- Public holidays in Austria
- Records of Austria
- Religion in Austria
  - Buddhism in Austria
  - Christianity in Austria
  - Hinduism in Austria
  - Islam in Austria
  - Judaism in Austria
  - Sikhism in Austria
- World Heritage Sites in Austria

=== Art in Austria ===
- Art in Austria
  - Austrian painters
- Cinema of Austria
- Literature of Austria
- Music of Austria
  - Music of Innsbruck
  - Music of Vienna
  - Austrian composers
- Theatre in Austria

=== Sports in Austria ===
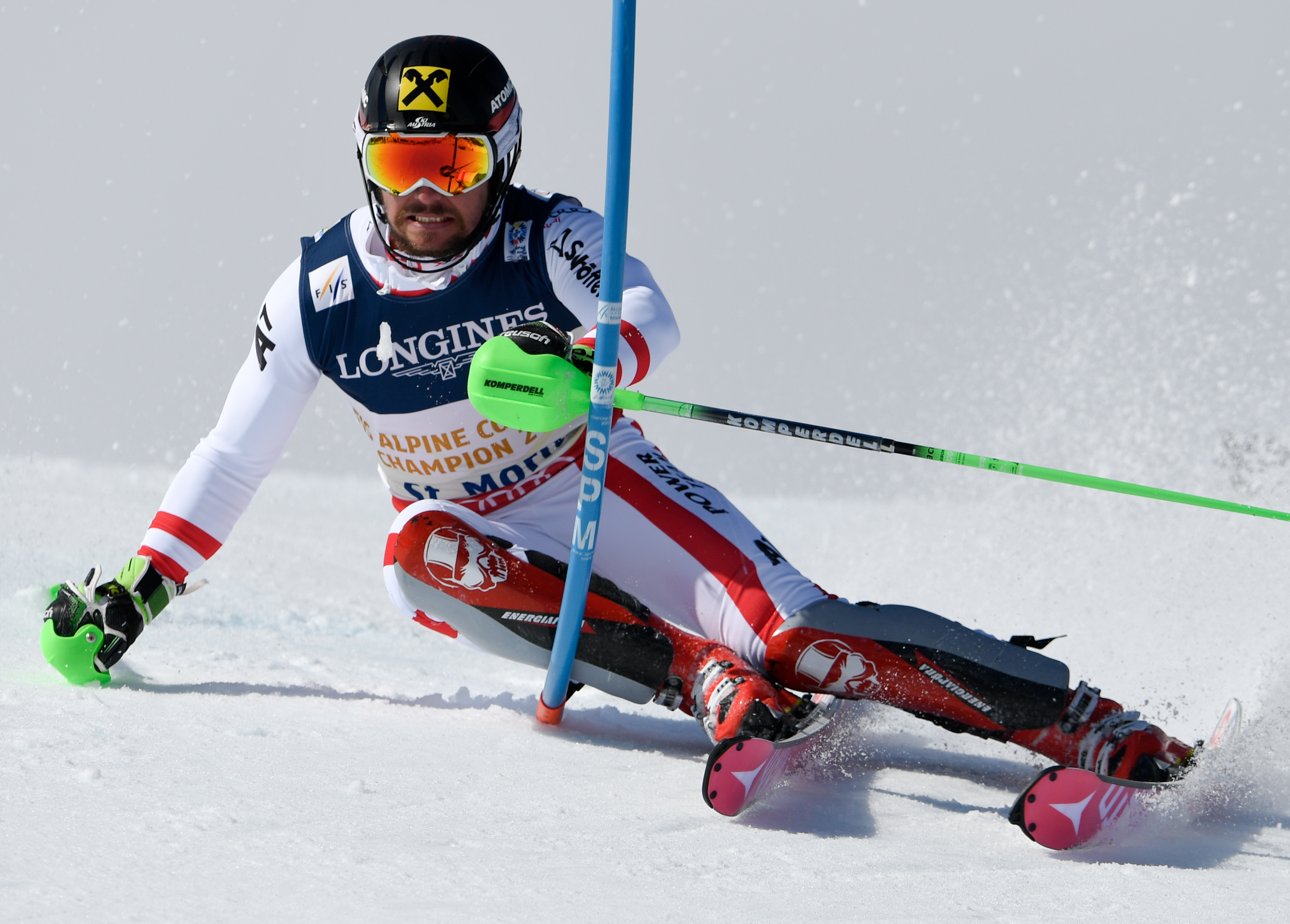
Marcel Hirscher, an Austrian alpine ski racer who won a record six consecutive World Cup titles

Sport in Austria

- Basketball in Austria
  - Austria national basketball team
- Football in Austria
  - Austria national football team
- Austria at the Olympics
- Motorsport in Austria
- Winter sports in Austria

== Economy and infrastructure of Austria ==
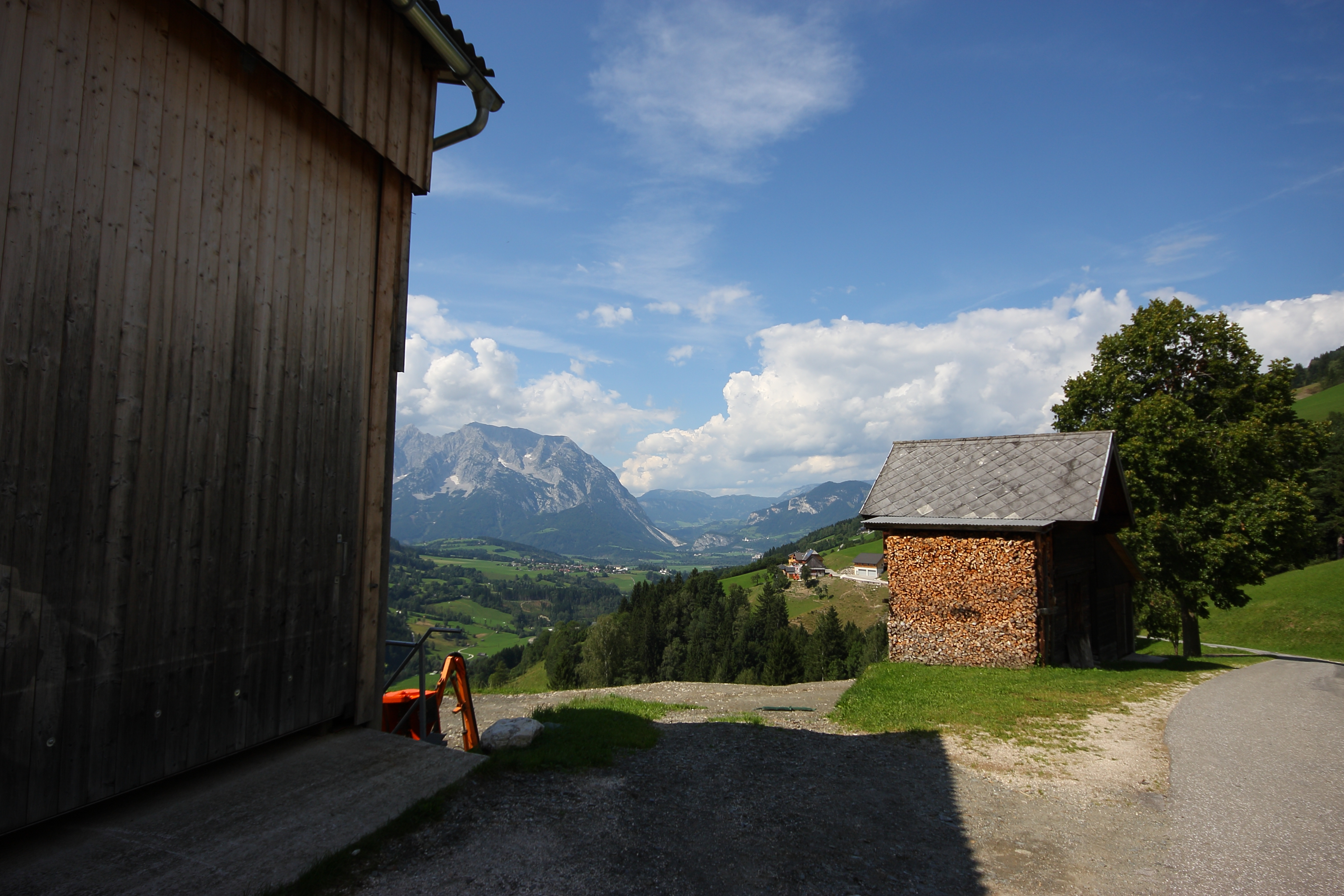
A farm in Austria

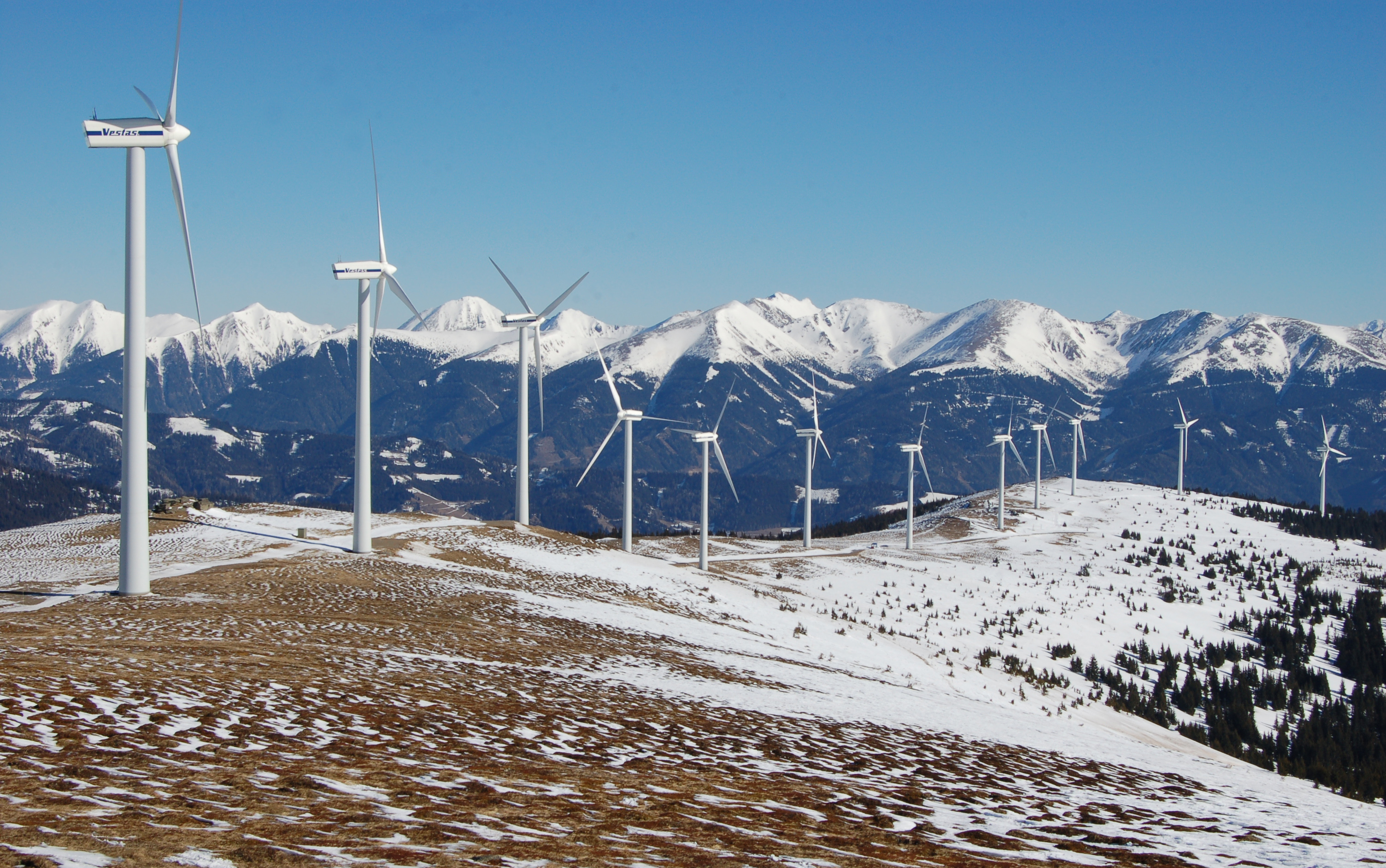
Vestas V66-1.75 MW wind turbines of the Tauern Wind Park in Oberzeiring

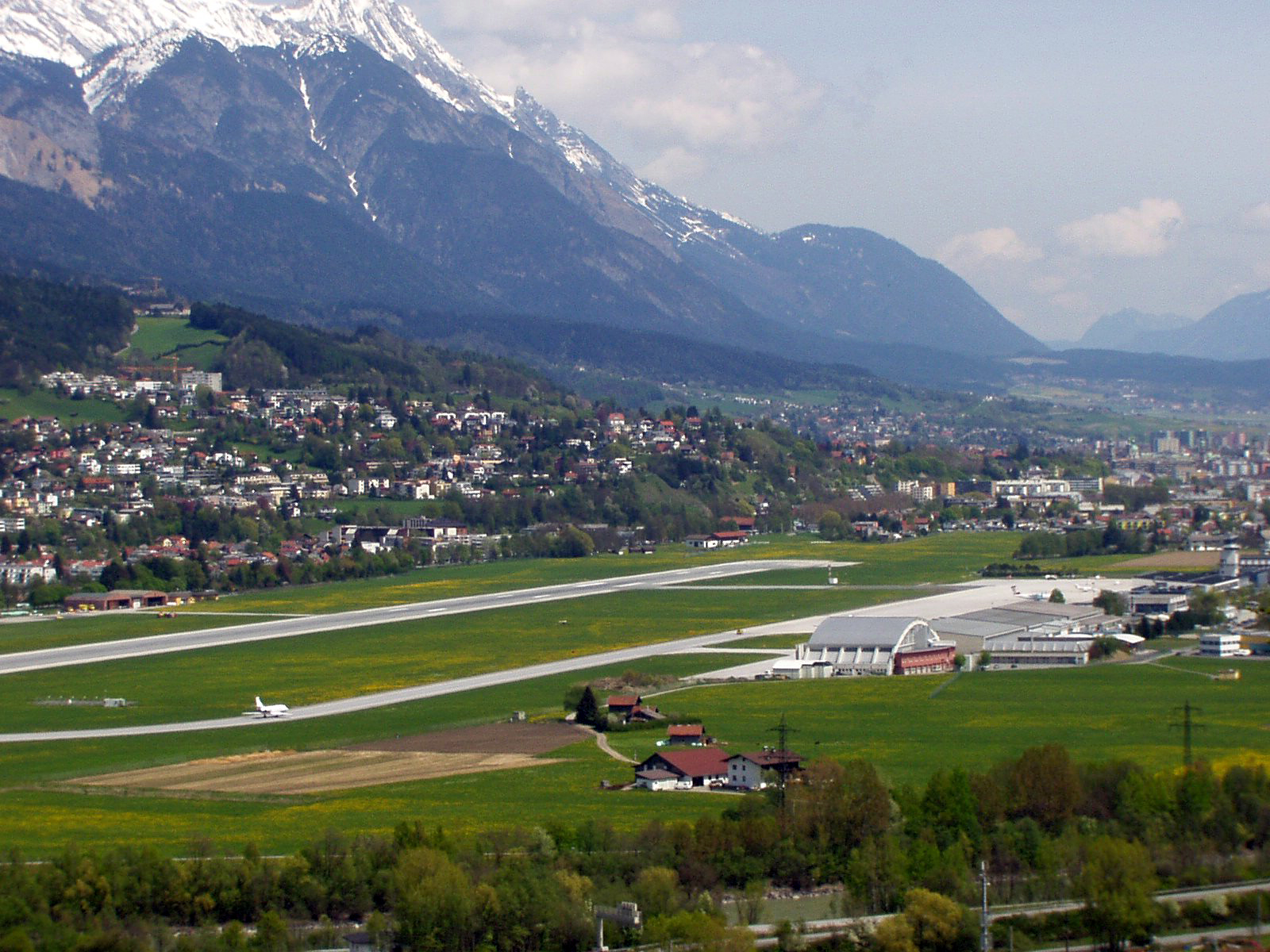
Innsbruck Airport

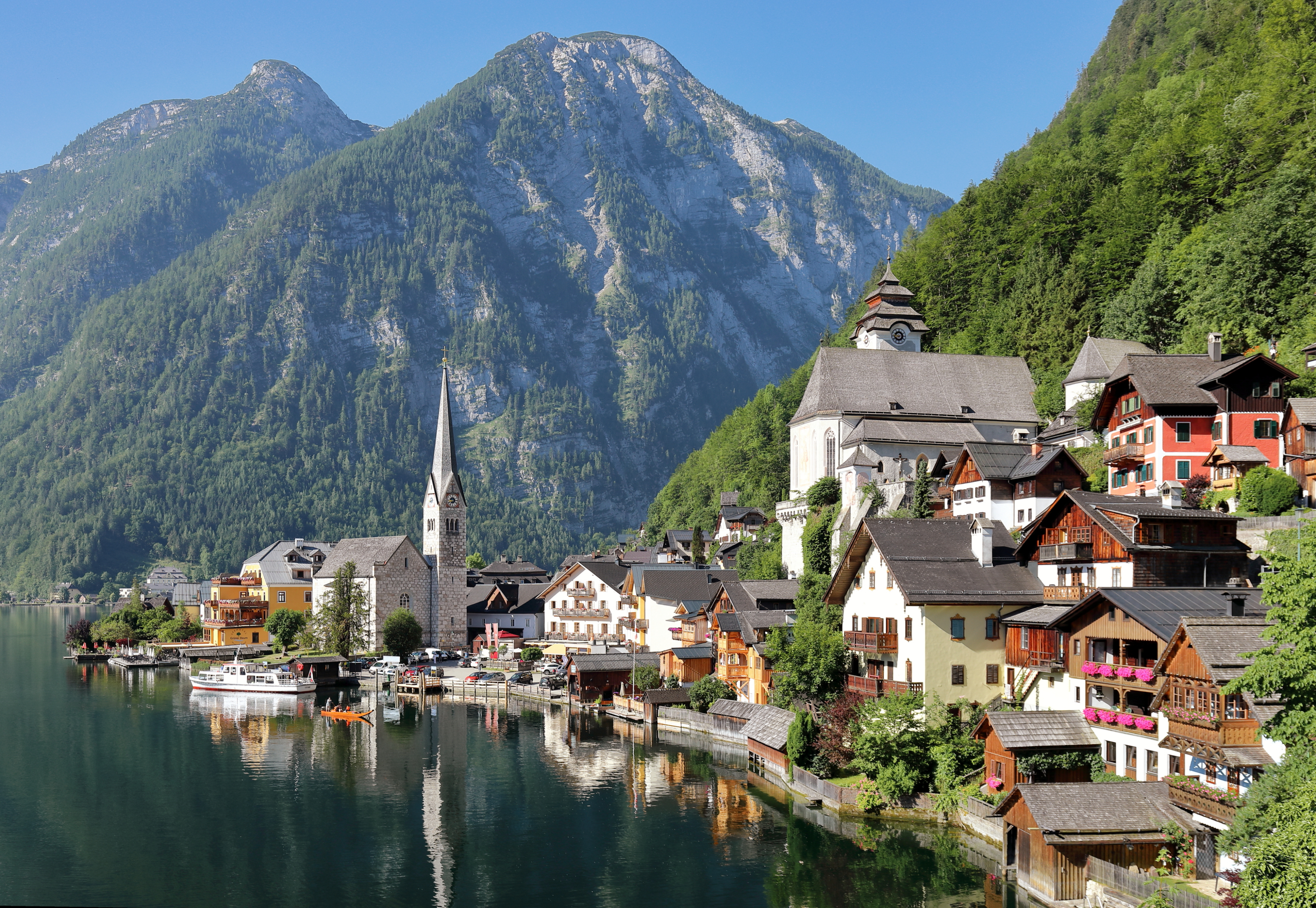
Hallstatt, one of the most visited places in Austria

- Economic rank, by nominal GDP (2007): 26th (twenty-sixth)
- Agriculture in Austria
- Banking in Austria
  - Oesterreichische Nationalbank
  - Wiener Börse
- Communications in Austria
  - Internet in Austria
- Companies of Austria
- Currency of Austria: Euro (see also: Euro topics)
  - Former currency: Austrian schilling
  - ISO 4217: EUR
- Energy in Austria
  - Energy policy of Austria
  - Wind power in Austria
- Health care in Austria
- Mining in Austria
- Tourism in Austria
  - Visa policy of the Schengen Area
- Transport in Austria
  - Airports in Austria
  - Rail transport in Austria
  - Roads in Austria
    - Road signs in Austria
  - Town tramway systems in Austria

== Education in Austria ==
- Academic grading in Austria
- Schools in Austria
- Universities in Austria
- Libraries in Austria

== See also ==
- Index of Austria-related articles
- List of Austria-related topics
- List of international rankings
- Member state of the European Union
- Member state of the United Nations
- Outline of Europe
- Outline of geography
