= Sport in Austria =

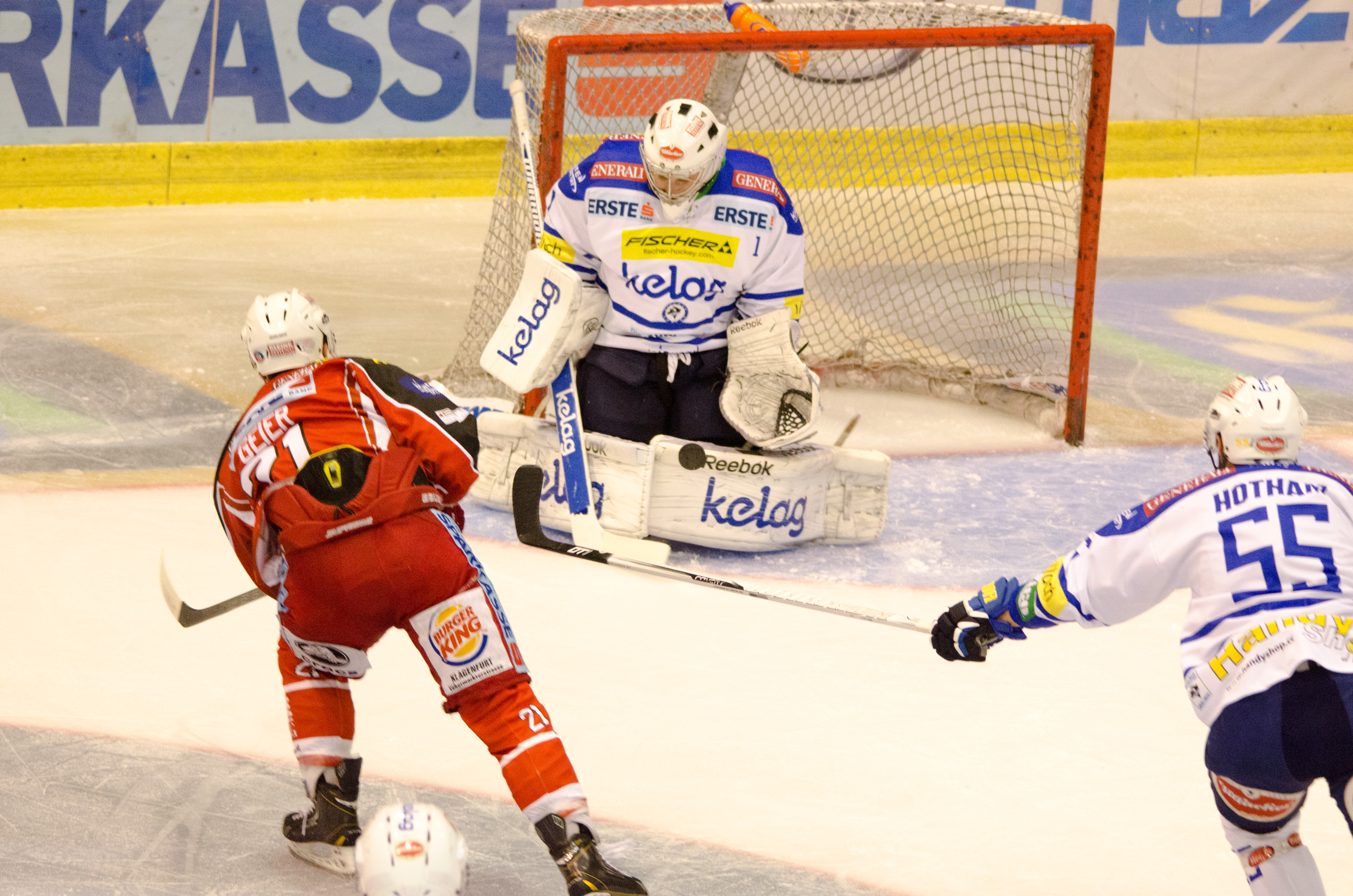
Austrian Hockey League match between KAC and VSV

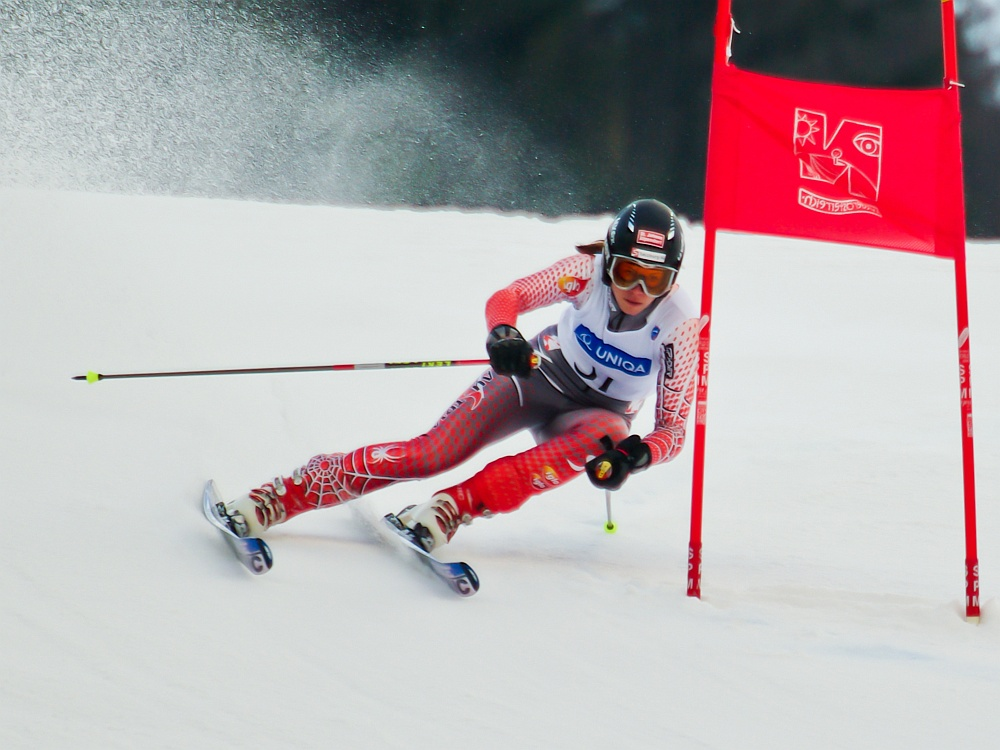
Mirjam Puchner at the Austrian Junior Skiing Championships

Sports are widely practiced in Austria, both in professional and amateur competitions. The most popular sports are association football, alpine skiing and ice hockey.

== Winter sports ==
Due to the mountainous terrain, alpine skiing is a prominent sport in Austria. Similar sports such as snowboarding and ski jumping are also widely popular, and Austrian athletes such as Annemarie Moser-Pröll, Hermann Maier, Toni Sailer and Marcel Hirscher are widely regarded as some of the greatest alpine skiers of all time. Austria has been the number one nation in alpine skiing and leading nation in ski jumping in the Winter Olympics, FIS Alpine World Ski Championships and FIS Ski Jumping World Cup. At the FIS Nordic World Ski Championships 2011, it took all five ski jumping gold medals. As of 2001, about a third of the 230 Olympic medals which had been won by Austrian sportspeople had been awarded in alpine skiing, and another 30 percent had been won in other winter sports, whilst a quarter of all golds at the Alpine Skiing World Championships had been won by Austrians. The Winter Olympics were held in the town of Innsbruck in the years of 1964 and 1976. Success at the elite level also helps to promote ski tourism and related industries: ski tourism and equipment manufacturing account for five percent of the country's gross national product, with half of the world's alpine skis being made in Austria. Around 40 percent of the Austrian population takes part in alpine skiing.

There are 12 professional ice hockey teams in the Austrian Hockey League, which also features one team each team from the Czech Republic, Hungary, Italy and Slovenia.

Bobsleigh, luge, and skeleton are also popular events, with a permanent track located in Igls, which hosted bobsleigh and luge competitions for the 1964 and 1976 Winter Olympics held in Innsbruck. The first Winter Youth Olympics in 2012 were held in Innsbruck as well.

== Association football ==
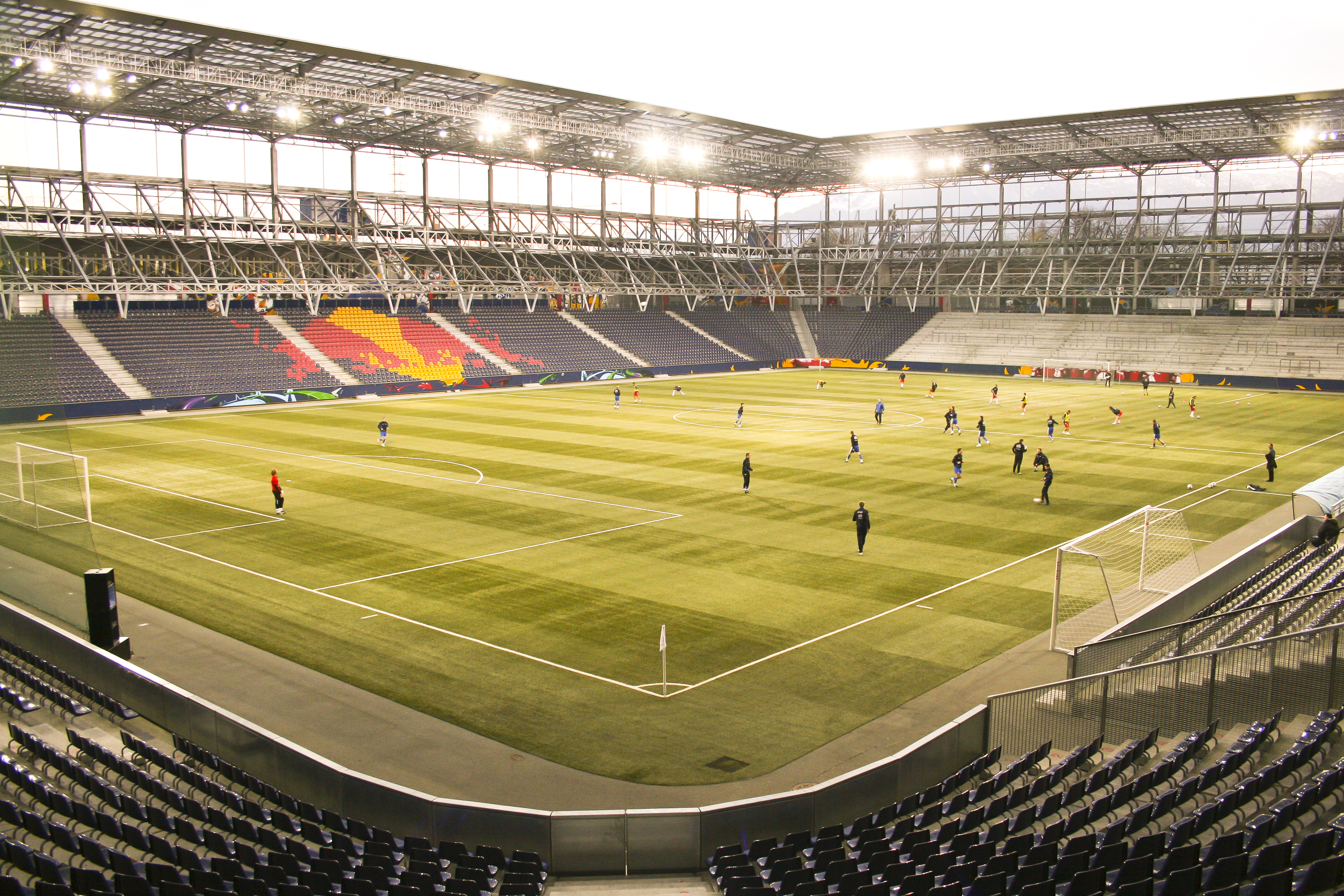
Red Bull Arena, home of FC Red Bull Salzburg

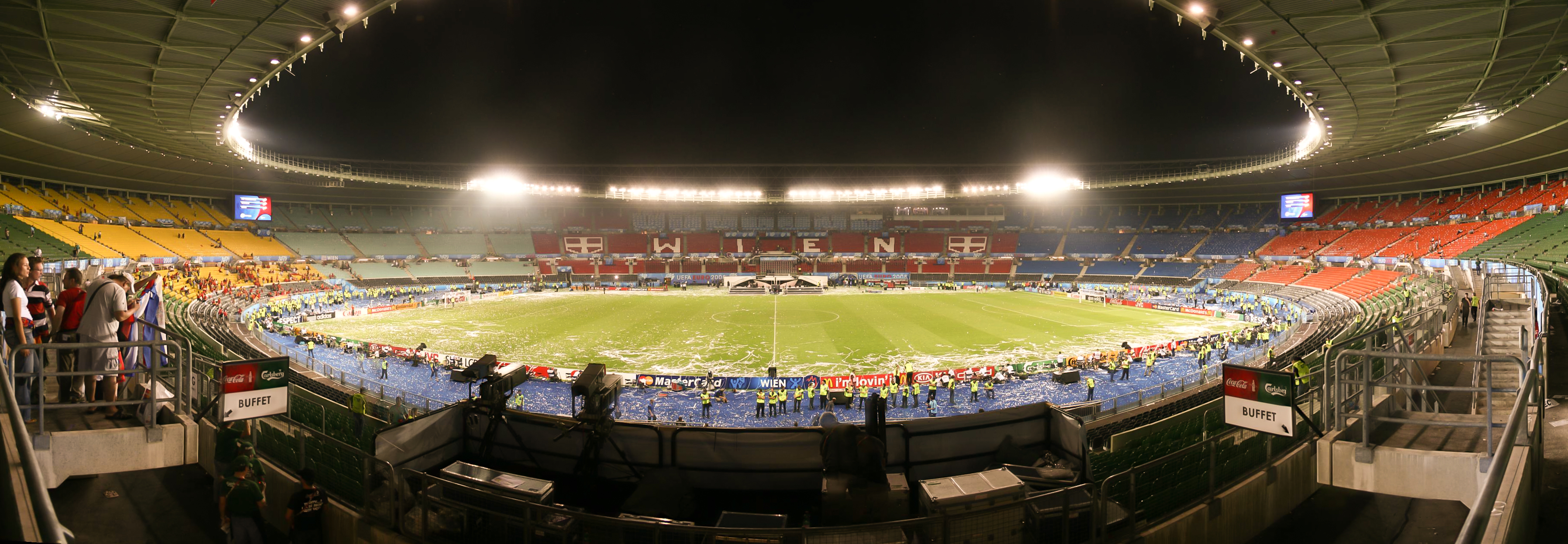
Ernst-Happel-Stadion, home of Austria national football team

Football is the most popular sport in Austria, which is governed by the Austrian Football Association. Austria was once among the most successful football playing nations on the European continent, placing fourth at the 1934 FIFA World Cup, third at the 1954 FIFA World Cup, and seventh at the 1978 FIFA World Cup. However, recently Austria has been much less internationally successful in this discipline. Austria co-hosted the 2008 UEFA European Football Championship with Switzerland.

== Tennis ==
Notable tennis players include Thomas Muster, winner of the 1995 French Open singles tournament; Dominic Thiem, winner of the 2020 US Open men's singles and finalist of the 2018 and 2019 French Open men's singles and 2020 Australian Open men's singles tournaments; Jürgen Melzer, world number 11 in the 2010 ATP World Tour and winner of the 2010 Wimbledon and 2011 US Open doubles tournaments; Barbara Schett, number 8 in the 1999 WTA Tour singles rankings; and Barbara Paulus, world number 13 in the 1996 WTA Tour singles rankings.

== Motorsport ==
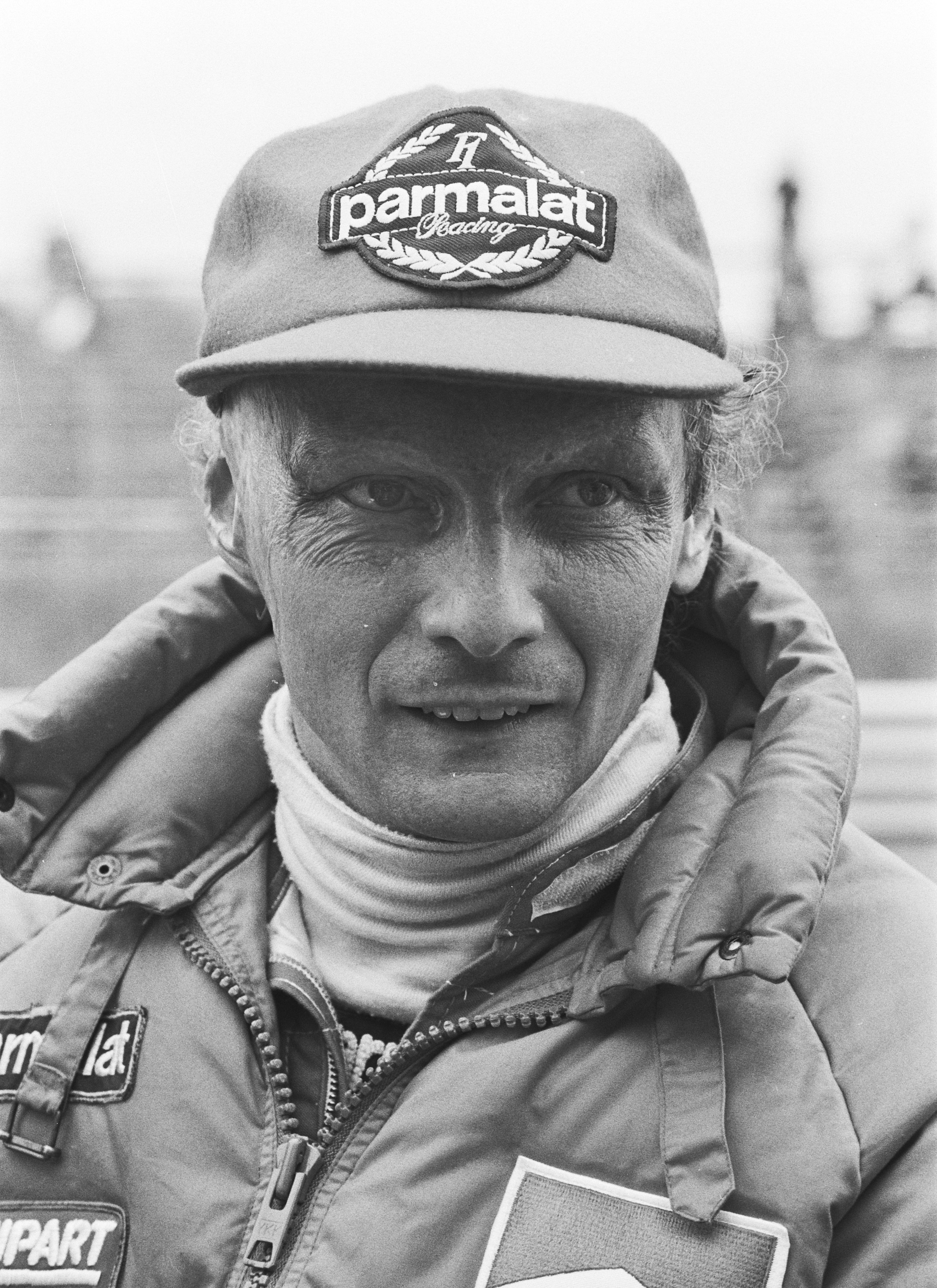
Niki Lauda, three-time Formula One champion

Motorsport is the third most popular spectator sport in Austria (after skiing and football). The Austrian Grand Prix is a Formula One race held in 1963, 1964, from 1970 to 1987, from 1997 to 2003 and since 2014. Several Austrian drivers have competed successfully in Formula One. Niki Lauda is a three-time champion (1975, 1977 and 1984) and seventh winningest driver with 25. Jochen Rindt was crowned 1970 champion, after being killed in practice for a race; he also won the 1965 24 Hours of Le Mans. Gerhard Berger ranked third in 1988 and 1994, and has collected 10 wins and 48 podiums.

The top two motorsport venues are Österreichring and Salzburgring. The former hosted the Austrian Grand Prix, the Austrian motorcycle Grand Prix, and the 1000 km Zeltweg endurance sports car race. The latter has also held the Austrian motorcycle Grand Prix, the Superbike World Championship, the European Formula Two Championship, and the top German series such as the Deutsche Tourenwagen Meisterschaft and the Super Tourenwagen Cup.

== Basketball ==
The country's prime basketball league is the Österreichische Basketball Bundesliga. Several of its teams have participated in European competitions.

Until the late 70s, Austria was one of Europe's main teams as it qualified for the EuroBasket six times. Since then, the team declined despite occasional strong showings at EuroBasket qualification games.

The most prominent Austrian basketball player today is Jakob Pöltl, who became the country's first NBA player in the 2016–17 season after having been selected by the Toronto Raptors in the first round of the 2016 NBA draft.

Austria is an emerging country for 3x3 basketball.

== DanceSport in Austria ==
Austria is an active member of the WDSF and hosts many annual competitions such as Austrian Open and world championships. Austrian dance athletes are noticeable in the world.

- Florian Gschaider and Manuela Stoeckl were amateur world ten-dance semifinalists in 2003 in Vancouver
- Vadim Garbuzov and Kathrin Menzinger are Austrian ballroom dancers and showmen. In 2015 they became world champions in Latin show and world show champions in Standard show.

Popularizing DanceSport, Austrian television holds annual Dancing Stars show that enjoys its 9th season as of 2014.

== Beach volleyball ==
Austria featured national teams in beach volleyball that competed at the 2018–2020 CEV Beach Volleyball Continental Cup in both the women's and the men's sections.

== See also ==
- Austria at the Olympics
