= Radio in Austria =

Aspect of the history of radio

== History ==
=== Pre-WWII ===
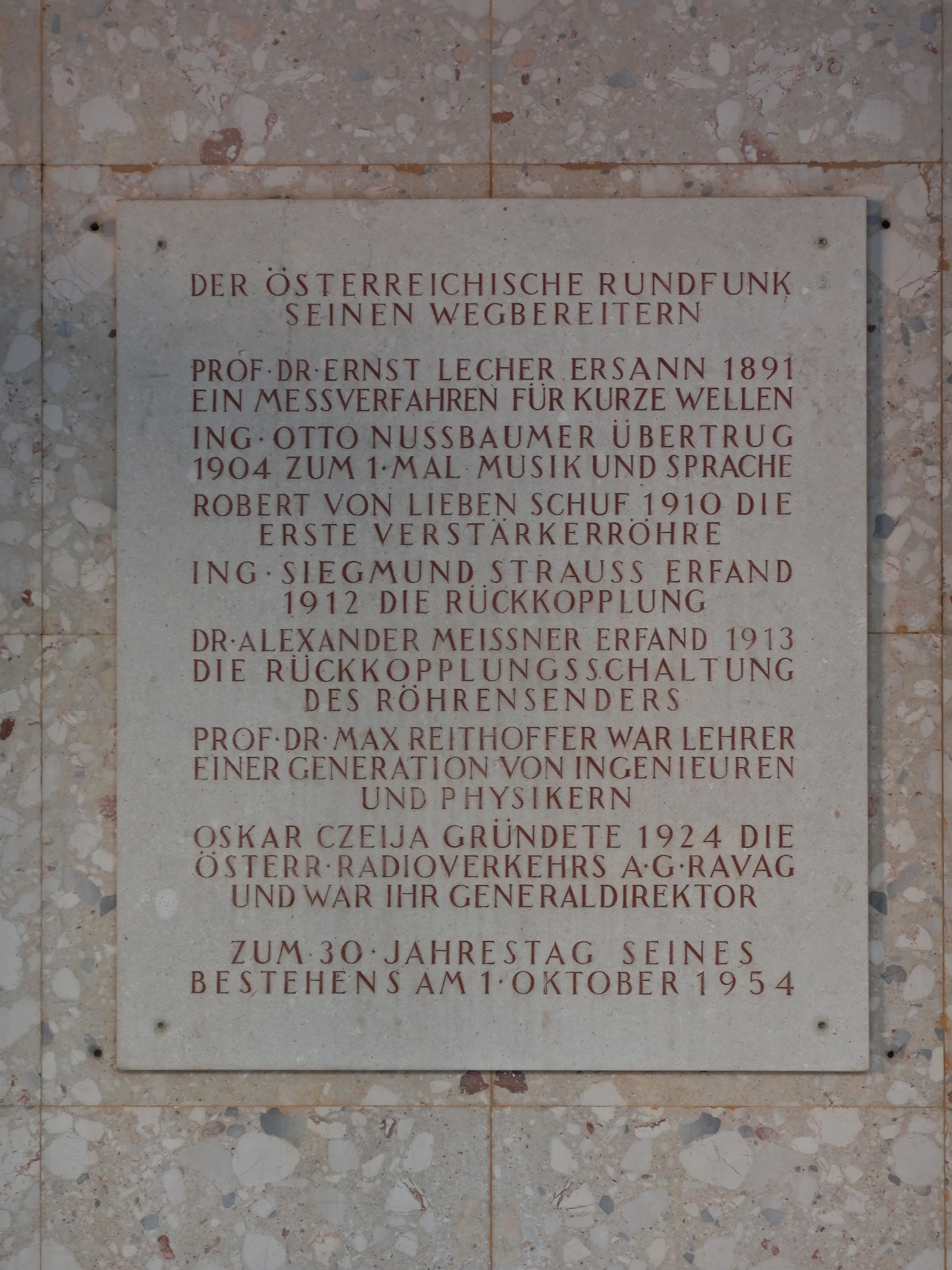
The memorial plaque in Argentinierstrasse commemorating Austrian radio pioneers

The first radio transmission in Austria was made on April 1, 1923 in Vienna. The transmitter used had only 100 Watts of power, transmitting in a frequency of 500 kHz. Programming started with classical music, daily news were not allowed to be broadcast to protect the newspaper producers. However, near the end of the 1920s, the political influence started to affect the medium radio as well. After 1933, Germany started transmitting propaganda directed at Austria, which was countered by the local radio stations. After Austria joined Germany in 1938, the Austrian radio stations became part of the German radio network.

=== Post-WWII ===
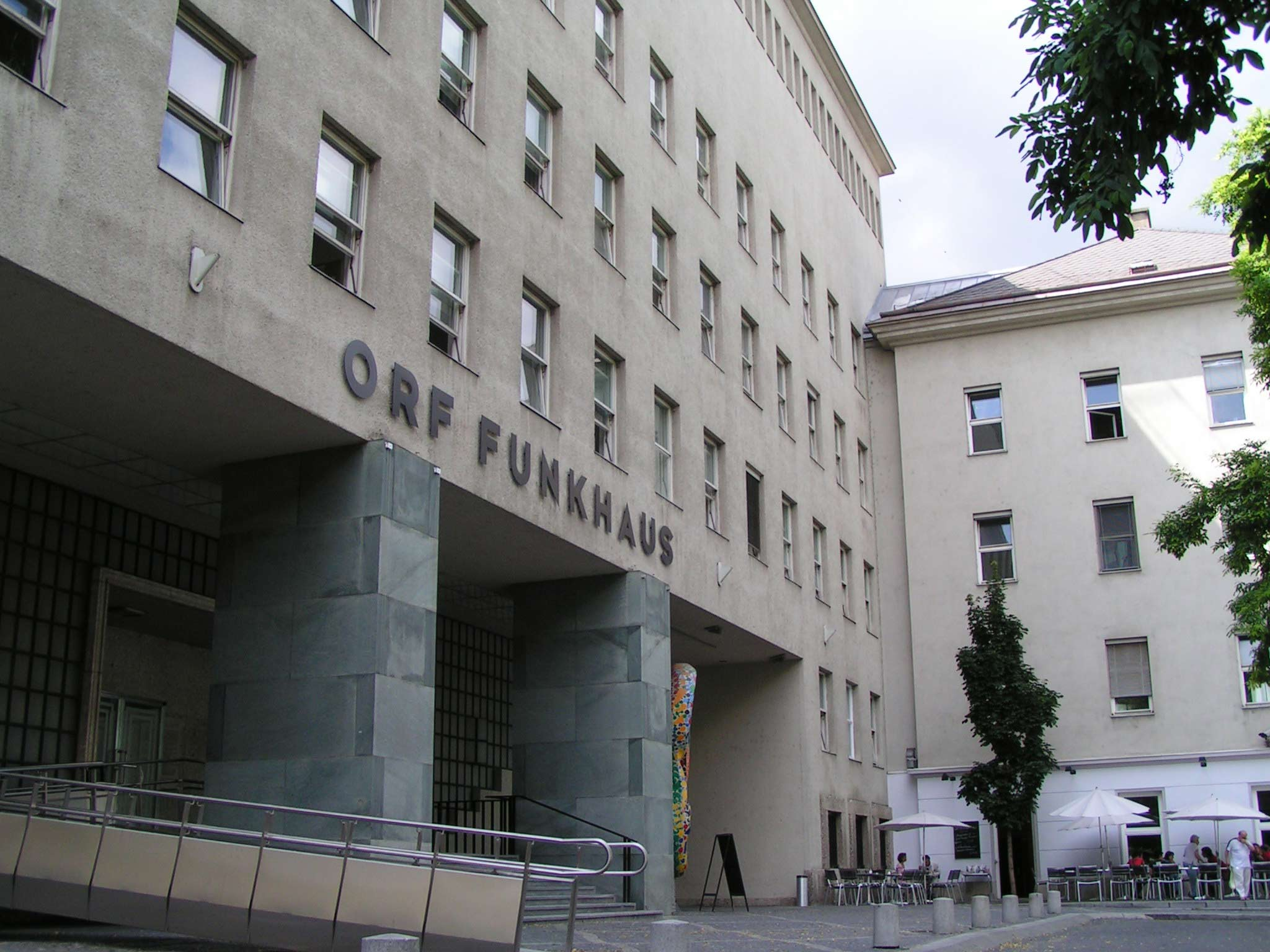
The Funkhaus in Vienna

After the end of World War II, the studio was located inside the Soviet occupation zone, so the programming had a small but noticeable Soviet influence. The other three occupation forces started their own programming as well, which competed with each other causing a huge variety of different radio stations for that time.

After Austria became independent again in 1955, programming consisted of three national radio stations, transmitted via medium wave and FM. Because the government refused to raise the radio fees, the third program had to be closed due to lack of money in 1962. Only in 1966, after a new law was enacted, could programming restart with three programs - Ö1, Ö2 and Ö3.

Soon, the decision was made to abandon medium wave, not just due to the lack of frequencies in Austria, but also because the alpine terrain proved to be difficult to cover by medium wave. By 1976, only 80% of the population was covered by medium wave at daytime, at night this number fell to 65%. Therefore, all medium wave stations were shut off, with the exception of the frequency 1476 kHz from Vienna (Sendeanlage Bisamberg) to cover Czechoslovakia. As well, a shortwave transmitter in Aldrans was used until the 80s to cover the deep Tyrolean valleys which couldn't be reached by medium wave or FM.

Especially Ö3 was innovative with their pop music format, which was unusual in Europe in the 60s and 70s. It caused a huge popularity of the station, as well as the Austropop music genre. In 1979, Blue Danube Radio was launched to target the various United Nations personnel present in Austria.

In the 1980s, because commercial radio stations were still illegal, the first radio stations started to broadcast from foreign territory, especially South Tyrol and the former Socialist countries in the east. In 1993, the European Union condemned Austria for forbidding commercial radio stations and thus violating free speech rights. In July 1993, the monopoly of Österreichischer Rundfunk was softened, allowing the launch of the first commercial radio stations in 1995. It took until 1997 for the ban on commercial radio stations to be lifted completely, and in 1998 several new stations launched in Austria.

Like in Germany, radio in Austria was completely separated by state, allowing radio stations to transmit in one state only. A law change 2001 allowed licenses for country-wide radio stations to be given out. So far, the only such license is owned by KroneHit.

== See also ==
- List of radio stations in Austria and Liechtenstein
