= Violent crime =

Crime in which an offender uses or threatens force upon a victim

A violent crime, violent felony, crime of violence or crime of a violent nature is a crime in which an offender or perpetrator uses or threatens to use harmful force upon a victim. This entails crimes in which the violent act is the objective, such as murder, assault and assassination; crimes in which violence is used as a method of coercion or show of force, such as robbery, extortion and terrorism; and violent crimes that result from unsafe working conditions, such as safety crime. Violent crimes may, or may not, be committed with weapons. Depending on the jurisdiction, violent crimes may be regarded with varying severities, ranging from harassment, criminal damage, manslaughter, to murder.

Violent criminals who use hostile acts towards others include killers, active shooters, kidnappers, robbers, sex offenders, burglars, arsonists and torturers. Another category of violent criminals are pirates and hijackers of cars or aircraft. Criminal organizations, gangsters and drug cartels frequently employ violent criminals in their group, usually as enforcers or hitmen. Violent criminals often display characteristics such as low anger threshold, disinhibition/absence of impulsivity control, strong dominance/territorial instinct, antisocial personality, psychological/mental health issues and aggressive tendencies which enable them to carry out usually violent acts.

== Violent crime by country ==
The comparison of violent crime statistics between countries is usually problematic, due to the way different countries classify crime. Valid comparisons require that similar offences between jurisdictions be compared. Often this is not possible, because crime statistics aggregate equivalent offences in such different ways that make it difficult or impossible to obtain a valid comparison. Depending on the jurisdiction, violent crimes may include: homicide, murder, assault, manslaughter, sexual assault, rape, robbery, negligence, endangerment, kidnapping (abduction), extortion, arson and harassment. Different countries such as Australia, Canada, New Zealand, Europe, and the United States all have different systems of recording and reporting crimes.

=== Australia ===
The International Crime Victimization Survey (ICVS) is one way Australia analyzes crime. This way is done separately from formal police reporting and allows the citizens of Australia to express their experience of crime that otherwise would not have been reported to the police. It is similar to the NCVS which is a survey that the United States does to estimate non-reported crime. The two major categories of the ICVS are personal crime and household crime.

The first annual national survey of crime victimization in Australia, the Crime Victimisation Survey, was conducted in 2008–09. Personal crimes included in the survey are:

Visual representation of a confrontation taking place that may lead to a personal crime occurring

- Physical assault
- Threatened assault (including face-to-face and non face-to-face)
- Robbery (including attempted)
- Sexual assault (including attempted)

One type of sexual offense is Intimate Partner Violence (IPV). Intimate Partner Violence often stems from other violent tendencies/ behavior such as anger, lack of self-control and/or mental instability. There is a gender gap that is notable when it comes to Intimate Partner Violence. Men are more likely to be guilty of general violence while women are more likely to be guilty of IPV. Lack of self-control in men has a direct correlation on whether they are guilty of IPV or not, while anger is more correlated to women on whether they engage in this type of behavior or not.

Household Crimes that often lead to violent crime include burglary and attempted burglary. Rates for household crimes were higher than personal crimes and this rate is calculated based on every 100 people per 100 households.

Australia (as well as New Zealand) classifies crime according to the Australian and New Zealand Standard Offence Classification (ANZSOC). Originally released in 1997 as the Australian Standard Offence Classification (ASOC), it was revised in 2008 and renamed in 2011 to reflect the international use of the standard in both countries and follows an agreed policy to harmonise classifications between the Australian Bureau of Statistics (ABS) and Statistics New Zealand. The standard has no single category for violent crime, but its first six divisions involve offences committed against the person:

01 Homicide and related offences;
02 Acts intended to cause injury;
03 Sexual assault and related offences;
04 Dangerous or negligent acts endangering persons;
05 Abduction, harassment, and other offences against the person;
06 Robbery, extortion, and related offences.

=== Canada ===
Canada conducts an annual measure of crime incidence called the Uniform Crime Reporting Survey (UCR). UCR "Violent Criminal Code" violations include: homicide, attempted murder, sexual assault, assault, robbery, criminal harassment, uttering threats, and other violent violations. Canada also collects information on crime victimization every five years via its General Social Survey on Victimisation (GSS). Among the eight GSS crimes tracked are three violent crimes: sexual assault, robbery, and physical assault.

=== New Zealand ===
Before the country adopted the Australian standard for classifying offences (ASOC) in 2010, New Zealand's crime statistics had a category for violence that included homicides, kidnapping, abduction, robbery, assaults, intimidation, threats, and group assembly, while all sexual offences were shown in a separate category from violence. Violent crime is not specifically defined New Zealand legislation, with the Crimes Act 1961 instead having separate legislation that deal with "Crimes against morality and decency, sexual crimes, crimes against public welfare" and "Crimes against the person". In 2015, New Zealand Police changed the way it counted crime from counting recorded offences, to counting people victimised or those found to be offending. The rationale behind the change was that instead of just simply recording the offense, analyzing who exactly is the victim and who exactly is the offender can be more helpful in understanding the nature of the violent crime along with pointing out any trends/patterns. Historic recorded offence statistics from 1994 to 2014 are available from Statistics NZ, while more recent statistics are available from New Zealand Police via policedata.nz. While violent crime is not defined in New Zealand Law, the first 6 divisions of the classification standard do define offences against the person.

=== Europe ===
Austria, Czech Republic, Finland, Germany, England, Latvia, Netherlands, Portugal, Greece and Sweden count minor violence such as slapping another person as assault. An example is the case of Ilias Kasidiaris in 2012. Kasidaris, then spokesperson for Greece's far-right Golden Dawn party, slapped a left-wing female opponent in the face during a live televised debate. He was subsequently wanted by Greek prosecutors for assault and faced an arrest warrant.

France does not count minor violence like slapping somebody as assault.

==== United Kingdom ====
===== Violence against the person =====
The United Kingdom includes all violence against the person including sexual offences as violent crime.

By 2014, violence against the person was considered the most heinous whereas historically, according to Simon DeDeo, crimes against property were equally important.

Rates of violence against the person in the UK are recorded by the British Crime Survey.

Statistics from the 2010/2011 report on crime in England and Wales showed that violence against the person continued a general downward trend observed over the last few decades. "The 2010/11 BCS showed overall violence was down 47 percent on the level seen at its peak in 1995; representing nearly two million fewer violent offences per year."

In 2010/11, 31 people per 1,000 interviewed reported being a victim of violent crime in the year before. Homicide had increased 2% to 3% per year from the 1960s through to the end of the twentieth century.

In 2011, the UK homicide rate had declined by 19 percent since 2001/02 as measured by The Homicide Index.

=== United States ===
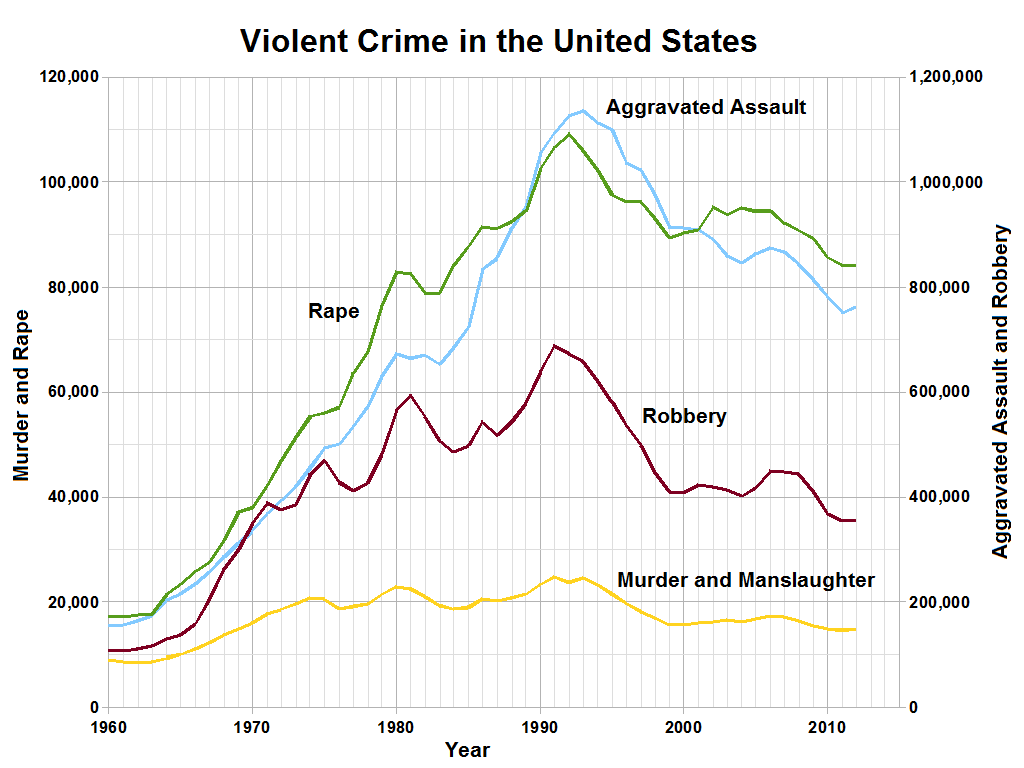
Violent crime in the United States per the Uniform Crime Report (UCR)

Among 15 high-income countries, the U.S. has both the highest homicide rate, and the largest number of homicides (chart shows homicide data for 2021 in selected countries).

The U.S. federal government's definition of a "crime of violence" is stated at Title 18 of the United States Code Chapter 1 § 16:

The term "crime of violence" means—

(a) an offense that has as an element the use, attempted use, or threatened use of physical force against the person or property of another, or
(b) any other offense that is a felony and that, by its nature, involves a substantial risk that physical force against the person or property of another may be used in the course of committing the offense.

Clause (b) of the definition was ruled void for vagueness by the United States supreme court in Sessions v. Dimaya.

There are two main crime databases maintained by the United States Department of Justice (DOJ): the Bureau of Justice Statistics' National Crime Victimization Survey (NCVS) and the Federal Bureau of Investigation's Uniform Crime Report (UCR). Non-fatal violence is reported in the NCVS, which measures rape and sexual assault, robbery, and aggravated and simple assault reported by households surveyed by the U.S. Census Bureau. The UCR tracks similar non-fatal violence, plus murder and non-negligent manslaughter recorded by law enforcement.

There are significant methodological and definitional differences between the NCVS and UCR:

- The NCVS includes estimates of both reported and unreported crimes, while the UCR collects data on crimes recorded by the police.
- The UCR includes homicide, arson, and commercial crimes, while the NCVS does not.
- The UCR excludes simple assault (attacks or attempted attacks without a weapon resulting in either no injury or minor injury) and sexual assault, which are in the NCVS.
- The NCVS data are estimates from a nationally representative sample of U.S. households, but the UCR data are based on the actual counts of offenses reported by law enforcement.

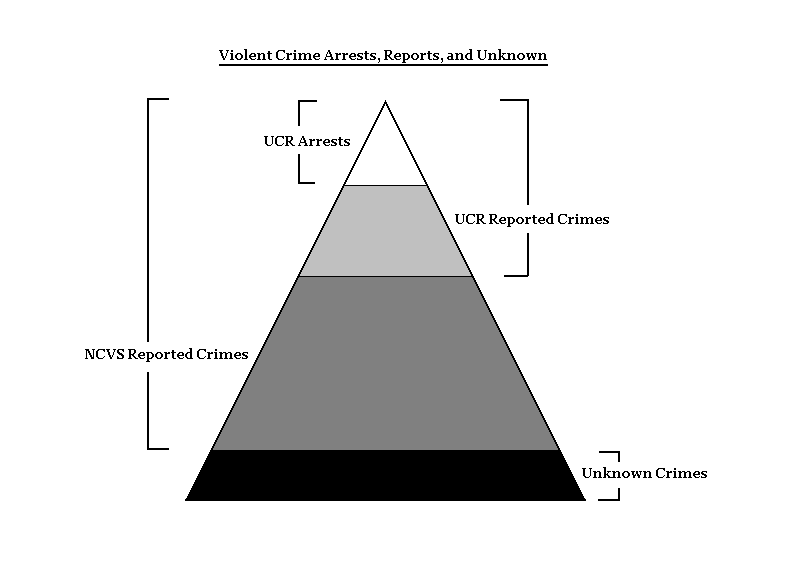
Comparison of the UCR and NCVS in relation to reported/unreported crime

The NCVS excludes crimes against children under 12 years, persons in institutions, and, possibly, highly mobile populations and the homeless; however, victimizations against these persons may be included in the UCR. Since they use different methodologies and measure overlapping, but not identical, crimes, the data are complementary and not necessarily congruent.

UCR and FBI

In 2019, The FBI's data reports that there were approximately 1,203,808 Violent Crimes that occurred in the United States. Compared to statistics from last year, robbery, rape, and burglary offenses saw a decrease in rates while assault and murder saw a slight increase. Per 100,000 people living in the United States, 156 arrests were made that related to violent crime in some capacity. More specifically, for every 100,000 people, 3 arrests were made for murder, 7 for rape, 24 for robbery, and assault was the most common with 120 arrests made for every 100,000 people.

Bureau of Justice Statistics and NCVS

Color Coded Rates of Violent Crime in the United States (2019)

In 2019, The NCVS data collected consisted of 155,076 households across the United States. A notable statistic from this data collection is the rate of violent crime dropping 15% in 2019. Per 1,000 individuals interviewed, 7.3 people were said to be victims of a violent crime which is a decrease compared to 2018 (8.6 per every 1,000 people). Being a victim of a violent crime as it relates to race decreased as well. Black people saw a decrease of 29% while white people saw a decrease of 22%.

Violent crime in both the UCR and NCVS categories have a common variable: alcohol consumption. About 25% of American women have been victims of sexual assault while about 20% of American men have been the ones to commit this sexual assault and other violent behavior, which shows a clear gender gap. Women are disproportionately more likely to be victims of these categories in the United States. Alcohol is known to impair judgement which results in irrational decisions being made. The UCR rates for forcible rape are so low because women are unlikely to report being a victim of this violent behavior.

In 2011, the UCR violent crime rate had dropped to 386.3 cases per 100,000 persons, compared to 729.6 per 100,000 in 1990.

U.S. homicide data is also available in the National Vital Statistics System (NVSS).

Socioeconomic Status and Crime Rates

Socioeconomic status plays an influential role in levels of violent crime, there is a direct correlation between poverty and increased violence in deprived areas of the United States. People living in poverty are more likely to turn to violent crime as a means to provide for their family if they feel that the legal means of doing so are insufficient. Poverty can promote a Darwinian "survival of the fittest" approach where personal prosperity is prioritised over the lives of others, leading to an increased tolerance for committing violent crime.
