= Criminalization =

Process of categorising acts as crimes

Criminalization or criminalisation, in criminology, is the process by which behaviors and persons are transformed into crime and criminals. Previously legal acts may be transformed into crimes by legislation or judicial decision. However, there is usually a formal presumption in the rules of statutory interpretation against retrospective application of laws, and only the use of express words by the legislature may rebut this presumption. The power of judges to make new law and retrospectively criminalise behaviour is also discouraged. In a less overt way, where laws have not been strictly enforced, the acts prohibited by those laws may also undergo de facto criminalization through more effective or committed legal enforcement. The process of criminalization takes place through societal institutions including schools, the family, and the criminal justice system.

== The problems ==
There has been some uncertainty as to the nature and extent of the contribution to be made by the victims of crime. But, as Garkawe (2001) indicates, the relationship between victimology and criminology has become problematic. The concern is that, within the dialectic of Right Realism and Left Realism, a focus on the victim promotes rights selectively for certain victims, and advocates the assumption that some victim rights are more important than competing rights or values in society. For example, an Islamic feminist might seek consistency of treatment for women as victims and, therefore, demand the decriminalization of abortion, adultery, and seduction (Zina is a Hudud offense in sharia law), and the criminalization of domestic violence and sexual harassment.

In formal academically published theory, the real ruling class of a society reaches a temporary view on whether certain acts or behavior are harmful or criminal. Historically this one theory will be modified by scientific, medical evidence, by political change, and the criminal justice system may or may not treat those matters as crimes.

Conversely, when local politics determines that it is no longer a crime, they may be decriminalized. For example, Recommendation No. R (95) 12 adopted by the Committee of Ministers of the Council of Europe on the management of criminal justice, advocates that crime policies such as decriminalization, depenalisation or diversion, and mediation should be adopted wherever possible. But the law and order debate between right and left politicians is often superficial and unscientific, formulating policies based on their appeal to an uninformed electorate rather than properly conducted research.

== Principles ==
Several principles may underpin decisions about criminalization. These include the de minimis principle, that of the minimum criminalization. Under this principle, the general harm principle fails to consider the possibility of other sanctions and the effectiveness of criminalization as a chosen option. Those other sanctions include civil courts, laws of tort and regulation. Having criminal remedies in place is seen as a "last resort" since such actions often infringe personal liberties – incarceration, for example, prevents the freedom of movement. In this sense, law making that places a greater emphasis on human rights. Most crimes of direct actions (murder, rape, assault, for example) are generally not affected by such a stance, but it does require greater justification in less clear cases.

The policy of "social defense" can be seen as an opposing view. It argues that criminalization is used against "any form of activity which threatens good order or is thought reprehensible". The minimization principle may unwittingly prevent the adaptation of the law to new situations. In general, worldwide policy makers have created a myriad of smaller offences, in contradiction to the minimization principle and more in keeping with the social defence.

=== Harm ===
Leading criminal law philosophers, such as Dennis Baker and Joel Feinberg have argued that conduct should only be criminalized when it is fair to do so. In particular, such theorists assert that objective reasons are needed to demonstrate that it is fair to criminalize conduct in any given case. The commonly cited objective justification for invoking the criminal law is harmful to others, but it cannot deal with all situations. For example, people are not necessarily harmed by public nudity. Feinberg suggests that offence to others also provides an objective reason for invoking the criminal law, but it clearly does not as offence is determined according to conventional morality. Prostitution is another grey area, as some countries allow it in different forms, and it is hard to say whether or not it specifically harms the public in general. One argument may be that prostitution perpetuates the spread of sexually transmitted diseases, including HIV/AIDS, and therefore harms the public which partakes in the act of prostitution. However, the legalization of prostitution would change the way it is regulated, and law enforcement could find a way to prevent the spread of sexually transmitted disease, thus eliminating the health issue and the question of the morality of the profession would be weakened.

People experience a range of physical and social injuries in different contexts which will vary according to the level of economic and political development of their country. Some will be injured out of poverty and malnutrition, others by violence which might stem from a major conflict such as war or from the personal violence in a robbery. The environment may be damaged by pollution, there may be hazards at work. Many of these sources of injury will be ignored while the state may delegate powers of control to a number of different agencies within an international framework where supranational agencies and human rights organisations may offer assistance in responding to the causes of those injuries.

=== Moral approaches and autonomy ===
The extent to which behaviours considered morally wrong in a given jurisdiction should be criminalized is controversial. Lying or breaking promises are not in general criminalised, for example. Patrick Devlin believed that moral behaviour was essential in maintaining the cohesion of a state, and so lawmakers should be entitled to criminalise immoral behaviour. However, opponents of this approach typically suggest use of a harm principle only and that immorality is not a reason in itself since outcomes of such activity can be used to come to a conclusion alone. Devlin's argument uses the disgust of the general public as a definition of morality; however, issues involving prejudice have shown this to be flawed and opponents push for a much stricter definition if this approach is to be used. Devlin suggested a jury to give an indication of immoral behaviour. As well as prejudice, views were likely to vary widely on issues such as homosexuality, contraception and other matters, particularly those influenced by religion. Agreement would be hard to find. Other opposition has been from liberal groups which favour approaches which maximise individual rights. A moral basis for criminalization would be paternalistic, thereby contrasting with personal autonomy. The European Convention of Human Rights, in the most part supporting individual rights from government interferences, still includes a provision for interference "for the protection of health and morals" such as legally requiring seat belts to be worn (in some jurisdictions) are hard to justify if an individualistic approach is taken, since, if public health provision is ignored, little harm is caused to others.

Joseph Raz argues that the state cannot and should not enforce morality; rather, any attempt to limit individual autonomy should be done only to limit harm. Certain moral ideals may be justifiable if they extend autonomy. If the immoral conduct of others impinges on someone else's autonomy, then that can be legislated against. There are some groups for whom the principle of autonomy is weakened: those under an age of majority and those people who are impaired by, for example, a mental disorder. In general, these people are protected from activities with significant consequences, if they are not in a position to make reasoned decisions themselves. This may involve the criminalization of under-age drinking, smoking, gambling and sexual activities. Such criminalization is rarely challenged.

In British law, a distinction between public and private acts was made in the Wolfenden report, which examined sexual activities (particularly homosexuality and prostitution). Some acts would effectively become legal within private settings, but illegal in public settings. The justification for this was the concept of shock or offensive to the public. Such a line was favoured by Joel Feinberg, who argued that it was a good reason in support of legislation if it effectively prevented "serious offence" to persons other than the actor. Philosophers such as Feinberg struggle to quantify the ideology behind the illegality of acts which in another setting would be acceptable (that acts themselves not causing harm, for example), for example nudity. Since such acts publicly are made illegal on the basis of shock, then whether to criminalise depends on a shifting body of public opinion, which varies from place to place and from time to time. The concept of "insult" rather than "offensive" may be more specific.

=== Omission ===
Common law does not often find an actor liable for omission – failing to do something required by the law. Where this has applied it has typically been in industrial regulation, in matters of social security or some personal regulated activity such as driving (for example, in the case of a hit and run). These form conditions placed upon operating in a particular manner and are thus understood in that context. There are few general duties in common law jurisdictions, although these do include the responsibility of a parent to safeguard their children, to a landowner to prevent offences being carried out there, and to someone creating a dangerous situation to attempt to limit that danger. Proponents of limited liability for omissions suggest that the wording for such a law would be vague, possibly involving "reasonable" care or action, and so would be hard to enforce. This would give prosecutors wide discretion, which may be opposed to justice. Morally, omission is viewed by many as a far lesser problem than act; compared to murder, allowing someone to die is seen as much smaller. A requirement to spend one's time and energy helping others would seem to contradict the autonomy many other laws aim to provide the individual with.

Opponents point out these arguments fail to consider the harm that such omissions may cause, in contradiction to the harm principle many legal systems start out with. Life and physical integrity are often the highest priorities of a legal system. Difficulties in definition are in common with many other areas, theorists such as Feinburg point out. A non-burdensome rescue is likely to be less valuable than freedom of action. Limited liability is considered as article 223 of the French Penal Code, which criminalises: "(1) a person who voluntarily neglects to prevent a serious crime of offense against that person, if that crime could be prevented without personal risk or risk to others; and (2) a person who voluntarily neglects to give, to a person in peril, assistance which could be rendered without personal risk or risk to others." This is common with several other European jurisdictions. Whilst open to the criticisms of vagueness and prosecutor discretion, it has not been seen as overly oppressive.

=== Procedure ===
When a state debates whether to respond to a source of injury by criminalising the behaviour that produces it, there are no pre-set criteria to apply in formulating social policy. There is no ontological reality to crime. The criminal justice system responds to a substantial number of events that do not produce significant hardship to individual citizens. Moreover, events which do cause serious injuries and perhaps should be dealt with as crimes, e.g. situations of corporate manslaughter as seen in safety crime, are typically ignored or dealt with as civil matters.

The criminalization process defines and classifies behaviour. It broadcasts the laws so that no-one may have the excuse of ignorance, and applies the theories of punishment against those found guilty. Crime control is a major part of government policy, yet it remains ineffective in providing protection to all its citizens from harm. Such as it is, the process is made up of three components:

1. Creation of a social order. This is both a socio-economic process and an ideological process. Society must develop the apparatus of law creation, law enforcement and punishment and the system must be acceptable to the majority of those who live in the community. If the laws do not match the general mores, their enforcement will be a source of friction and disharmony. Conformity to the social order must, for the most part, be self-enforced.
2. For the times when self-enforcement fails, society must create a legal order. This part of the process sees the centralisation of power within the institutions of the political state. Some states justified the criminalization process as demonstrating their concerns about safety and security, the policy of control, policing, criminal justice, and penal practice. The modern state is decentralising and privatising its functions. This is changing the character and content of the remaining institutions of the state which must now work co-operatively with other for-profit agencies.
3. The political order must realign so that the remaining political entities such as legislatures and judges set agreed targets for state control and then produce actual outputs of the legal order, i.e. of people defined as criminal and processed through that system.

== Ontological basis of crime ==
Ontology deals with or establishes the clear grounds for being. (Heidegger, Martin, Being and Time, introduction, referencing Plato's Parmenides.) In some of the traditional schools, such as those of the post-1688 English or Americans (many of the writings of the American Founding Fathers, but especially The Federalist) and their Dutch predecessors (see Kossmann, E. H. Political Thought in the Dutch Republic, 2004) ontology proper is deemed beyond the scope of legal thought, in accord with the modern distinction between society and state (which some consider based in the distinction the Romans made between themselves and their Italian allies, the socii, but not given the theoretical articulation we recognize today until emphasized by Thomas Hobbes' Leviathan. See state.) However, some classical theorists, such as Aristotle, in his Politics and Metaphysics, and to a lesser degree in his Topics, suggest that the distinction is at least problematic. One need consider no further than the claim that man is a political animal to see this is so.

As a political animal, man has come to see himself as possessed of rights, whether these are the Rights of Englishmen of old, or the universal human rights advocated vigorously toward establishment today through the matrix of commercialism. At least in the today dominant American model, deprivation of right amounts to injury (consider especially Justice Stevens dissenting opinion in Castle Rock v. Gonzales), and injury—so goes the prevailing theory—amounts, when coupled with requisite intent, in most cases, to crime, when it does not admit of civil redress. To the extent that human beings are indeed political beings, crime does seem to have an ontological basis. (For one approach to the question of criminal ontology, see "Understanding Crime and Social Control in Market Economies: Looking Back and Moving Forward" by Robert Bohm in Jeffrey Ian Ross, ed. Cutting the Edge: Current Perspectives in Radical/Critical Criminology and Criminal Justice. Westport, Conn: Praeger, 1998.) This, further, seems to hold if ontology itself is divided into political and trans- or supra- or meta- political ontology—i.e., what once was the realm of Christian theology. It does not matter whether that theology is Christian or belonging to some other apolitical belief. The point is that one may, with some justice, argue persuasively that being is divided. This need not, however, force the question of meta-political crimes. Our purposes here, in this article, are limited to the political. For the question in general see Ontology.

Baker argues that only objective harms and other objective bad consequences (or actions in the case of inchoate and endangerment offenses) are prima facie criminalizable. By other bad consequences Baker means privacy violations and conduct that does not necessarily result in tangible harm, but does result in unwanted consequences. Baker argues that the privacy violations that result from being forced to receive unwanted obscene information in public places (exhibitionism) would amount to a sufficient bad consequence for the purposes of invoking the criminal law, but argues that proportionate punishment means that such conduct should only be punished with fines rather than jail terms.

== See also ==
- Crime in the United States#Number and growth of criminal laws
- Criminalization of homelessness
- Criminalization of homosexuality
- Decriminalization, the reversal of criminalization
- Drug criminalization
- Overcriminalization
- Zero tolerance
