= Criminal costs =

Legal topic

Criminal costs are financial penalties awarded against convicted criminals, in addition to the sentence they receive, in recognition of the costs of the court in bringing the prosecution.

== England and Wales ==
A magistrates' court or the Crown Court may award such costs as are "just and reasonable" against an offender. Usually, these are much less than the full economic cost of the prosecution as the court must consider the offender's ability to pay. An exception is the specific case of health and safety prosecutions where the court will award the totality of prosecution costs against the offender.

Where an offender was allowed legal aid for his defence, the Crown Court may make a Recovery of Defence Costs Order that he repay all or part of his defence costs.

An acquitted defendant will usually be allowed a Defendant's Costs Order to pay for his defence unless there are special circumstances such as his having acted in such an unreasonable manner as to bring suspicion on himself. Since October 2012, it has not been possible to recover private defence costs for Crown Court proceedings. This means that defendants choosing private, as opposed to Legal Aid, representation in the Crown Court cannot recover their costs even if they are acquitted of all charges.

== See also ==
- Collateral consequences of criminal conviction

== Bibliography ==
- Sprack, J (2006). A Practical Approach to Criminal Procedure (11th ed.). Oxford: Oxford University Press. pp. pp557–560. ISBN 0-19-929830-0.
