= Tyrolean Mountain Guards =

The Tiroler Bergwacht (Tyrolean Mountain Guards) is a public corporation, and is based in Innsbruck, Tyrol. The legal basis is the Tiroler Bergwachtgesetz (Tyrolean Mountain Guards Act) of 3 July 2002. The Tyrolean Mountain Guards is thus one of nine mountain and nature conservation organisations in Austria.

== History ==
The first Tyrolean Mountain Guards Act came into force on 31 October 1927. The tasks of the mountain guards under this law were "The protection of persons and property in field, alp and forest property, alpine shelters, their equipment and accessories and the maintenance of contamination or disfigurement of the area by tossing and dropping objects, especially so far the danger, injury or pollution is related to a sporting activity or excursion traffic ".

In 1938, the mountain guards were made subordinate to the gendarmerie as an auxiliary police force. The duties remained the same as before the merge. While Austria was annexed by the Nazis the nature reserves in Tyrol were greatly expanded, with the mountain guards continuing in their role of enforcing conservation laws.

In 1978 the new Tyrolean Mountain Guard Act 1977 came into force. The mountain guards were merged into a body of public law enforcement, providing more powers to guards to great regulatory oversight. The exercise of mountain rescue services was regulated, but continued not to be a core focus.

In 2002 an amended version of the Tyrolean Mountain Guard Act 1977 was passed. It was the first time mountain rescue services were outlined in the Mountain Guard Act. In 2007, the Tyrolean mountain rescue service stations were also equipped with digital radio systems, which has allowed statewide communication.

== Task Area ==
The members of the Tiroler Bergwacht are sworn in officers of public supervision and supervise as auxiliary officers of the district administrative authorities in the designated area of activity according to mountain guard law §1:

- Tyrolean nature conservation law with associated regulations
- Tyrolean National Park Law Hohe Tauern
- Tyrolean Waste Management Act
- Landespolizeigesetz Noise protection, protection against endangering and harassment by animals
- Tyrolean field protection law
- Tyrolean camping law

In section 10 of the Tiroler Bergwachtgesetz, the mountain guard is also to be used as a rescue service in the case of natural disasters and other rescue operations.

== Uniform ==
The Tiroler Bergwachtgesetz precisely regulates the appearance of the mountain guard. The uniforms are sourced from the clothing management fund of the B.M.I. In the long term, this enables the most economical efficient procurement of service clothing. For all weather conditions, there are various outer clothing and jacket options (multipurpose jackets, fleeces, and fleece jackets). Furthermore, mountain guards are provided short- and long-sleeved shirts, a rock-grey alpine trousers, and a baseball cap and beret headgear. The position of a mountain guard is recognisable by the rank slides worn.

== Powers ==
The supervisory organisations of the Tiroler Bergwacht gave the Bergwacht special powers to enforce the law of the Tyrol Landtag. Mountain guards are allowed to enforce these state laws:

- Stop people and vehicles and ask for proof of identity.
- Issue warnings or report violations to the district administrative board (at the discretion of the incoming supervisory board).
- In special cases, arrest people and present them to the district administration.
- Confiscate objects that being in possession of such constitute an offense.
- Specially trained mountain guards may collect fines.

== Ranks ==
Former ranks of the Tiroler Bergwacht
| German rank titles | Landesleiter | Landesleiter-Stellvertreter | Landesreferent | Bezirksleiter | Bezirksleiter-Stellvertreter | Bezirksreferent | Einsatzstellenleiter | Einsatzstellenleiter-Stellvertreter | Bergwächter | Anwärter |
|---|---|---|---|---|---|---|---|---|---|---|
| Former rank insignia | | | | | | | | | | |
| Translations of rank titles | State Director | Deputy State Director | State Consultant | District Manager | Deputy District Manager | District Consultant | Head of Department | Deputy Head of Department | Mountain Guard | Candidate |

Current ranks of the Tiroler Bergwacht
| German rank titles | Landesleiter | Landesleiter-Stellvertreter | Landesreferent | Bezirksleiter | Bezirksleiter-Stellvertreter | Bezirksreferent | Einsatzstellenleiter | Einsatzstellenleiter-Stellvertreter | Einsatzgruppenleiter | Bergwächter | Anwärter |
|---|---|---|---|---|---|---|---|---|---|---|---|
| Current rank insignia | | | | | | | | | | | |
| Translations of rank titles | State Director | Deputy State Director | State Consultant | District Manager | Deputy District Manager | District Consultant | Head of Department | Deputy Head of Department | Group Leader | Mountain Guard | Candidate |

== See also ==
- Bergwacht
- Forest Ranger
- Law enforcement in Austria
- Mountain Rescue
- Park Ranger
- Swiss Alpine Club
