= Bergwacht =

German mountain rescue organization

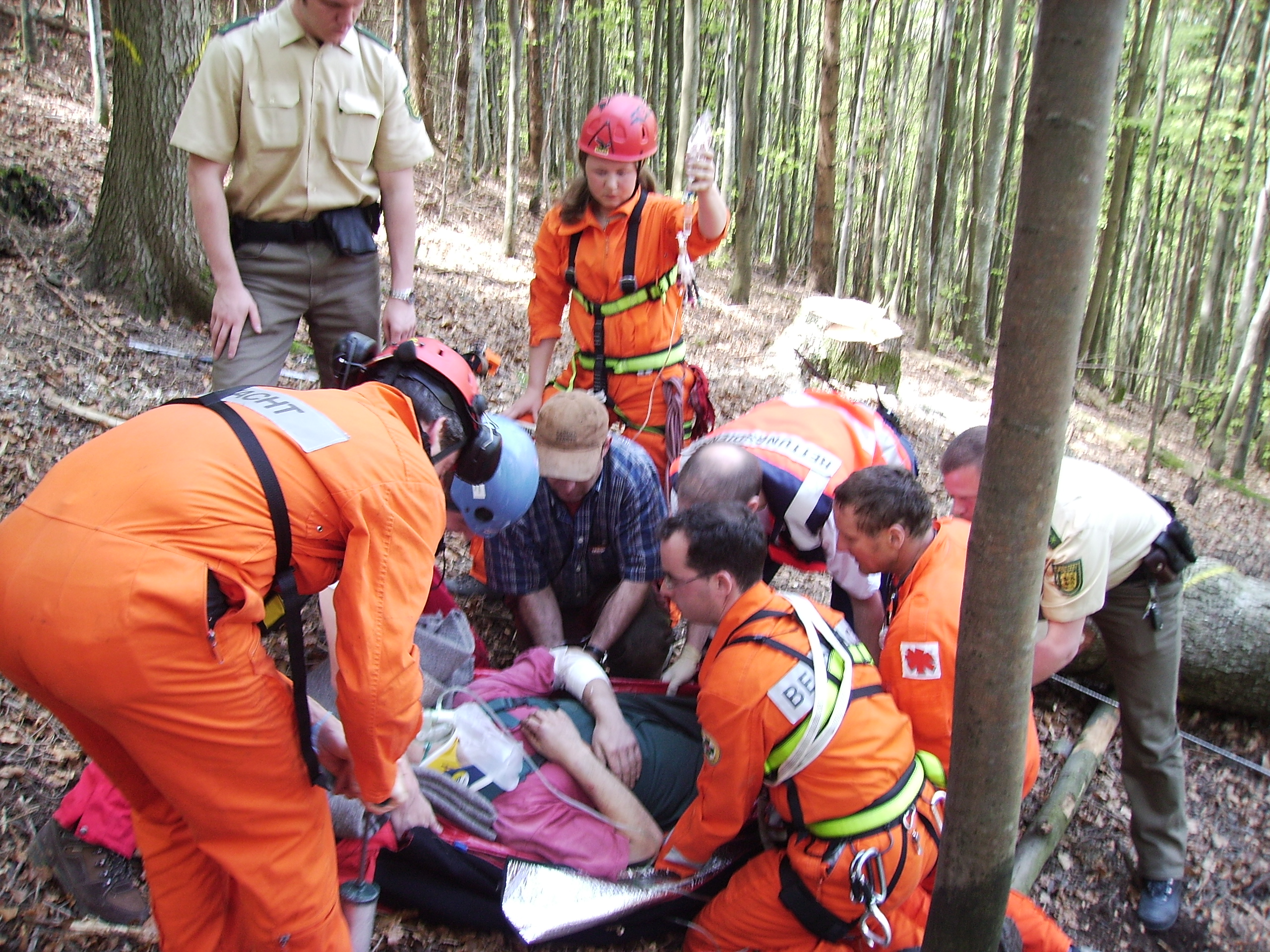
Bergwacht unit treating a forestry worker

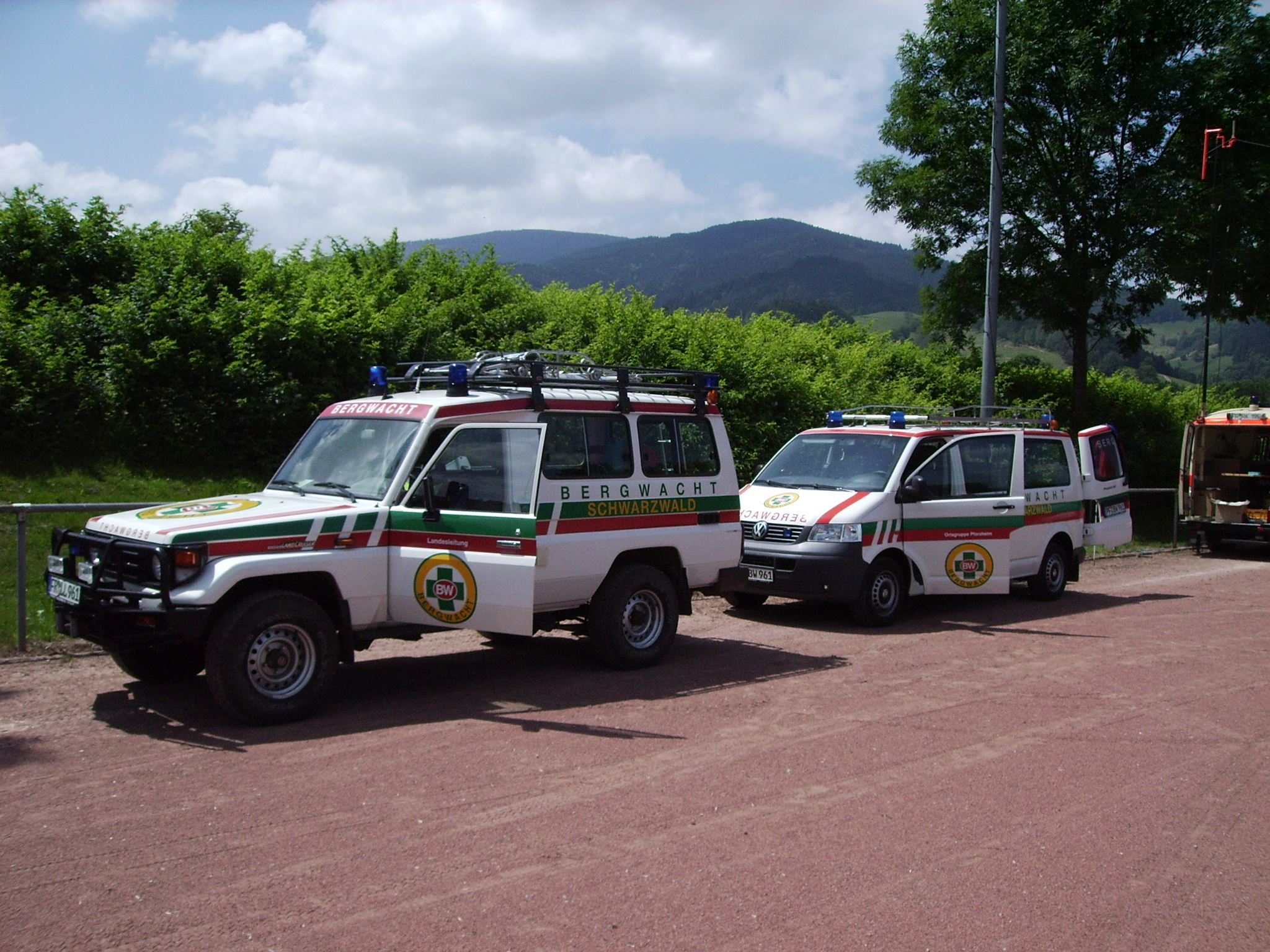
A Toyota Landcruiser and a VW Bus of the Black Forest Bergwacht

The Bergwacht is an organisation that is part of the German Red Cross (DRK-Bergwacht), whose primary functions are mountain rescue and nature conservation. The voluntary organisation provides over 90% of the emergency services in the impassable terrain of the German Central Upland and Alpine regions. By contrast the Austrian Berg- und Naturwachten Österreichs purely looks after nature conservation and the environment, leaving Alpine rescue in the hands of the Austrian Mountain Rescue Service (Österreichischer Bergrettungsdienst).

== Objectives ==
The objectives of the Bergwacht are multi-faceted:

Save life:

- Rescue (and recovery of those fatally injured) from alpine and impassable terrain
- rescue from heights
- Medical treatment of casualties
- Searching for missing persons (see also Search and Rescue)
- Rescue from avalanches, gorges and caves
- Care and support of relatives (including the mountain crisis intervention service (KID Berg))
- Support for the DRK in overseas operations
- Support of the ground-based emergency medical services and Emergency management

Nature conservation:

- Management of nature reserves and nature reserve projects
- Support to the Naturschutzwacht and the Naturschutzbeiräte
- Support of the required nature reserve projects (e. g. wild animals and skiing in the mountains)
- Public and youth work in the conservation of nature and the environment (e. g. nature youth camps)

== History ==
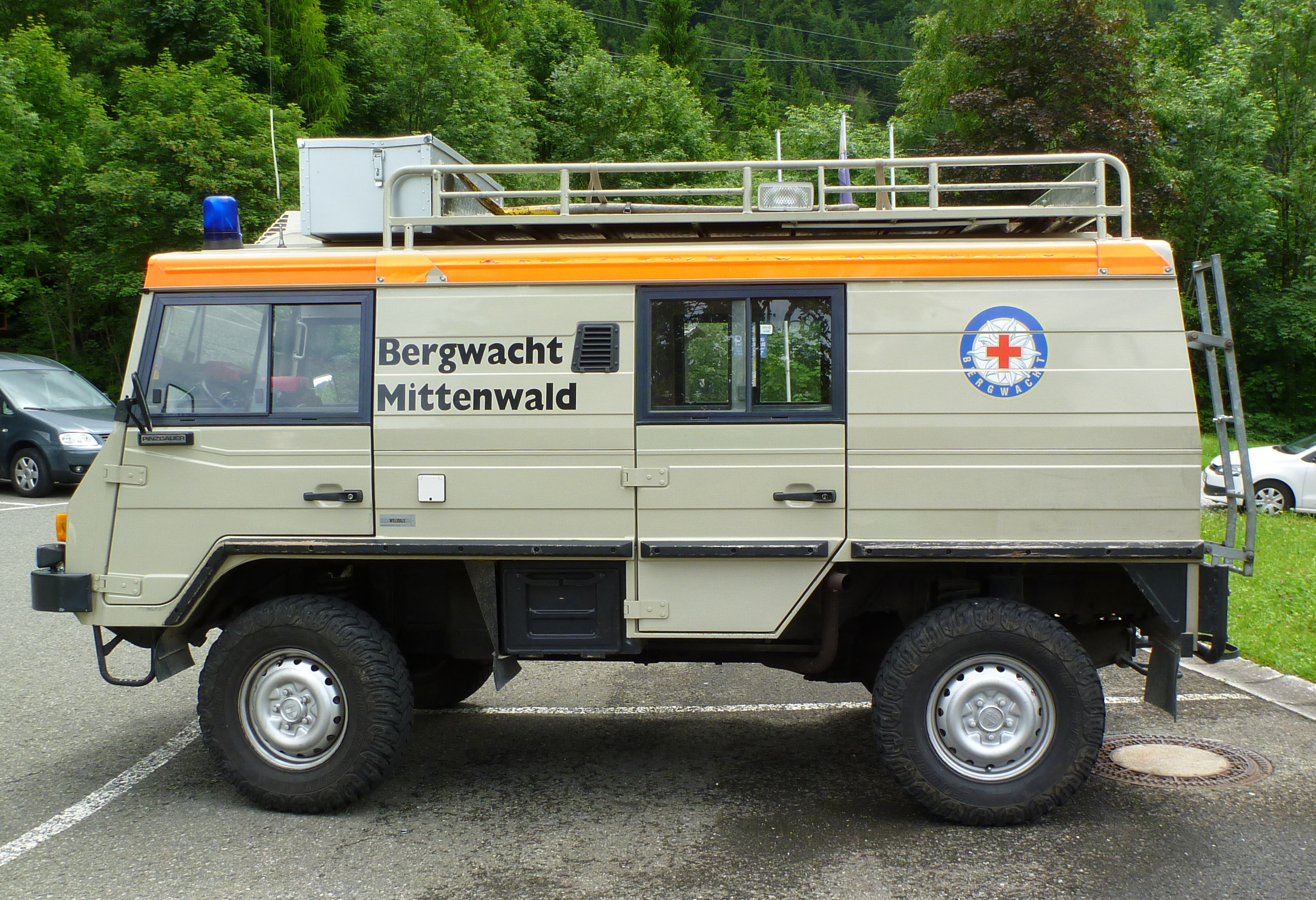
A Pinzgauer High-Mobility All-Terrain Vehicle of the Bergwacht in Mittenwald in the Bavarian Alpes, which is rarely used for this purpose in Germany

The first German mountain rescue service existed in Saxony as early as 1912. It consisted of the Samaritan department of the Saxon Mountaineering Association. In 1920, Munich men founded a German mountain rescue service with the aim of restoring order, custom and decency in the mountains. The rather desolate conditions in the mountains after the First World War, with poaching, theft of huts, cattle and wood, prompted the founders to join forces to "protect the mountain from the people". A short time later, the Red Cross founded the Mountain Accident Service (GUD), an association of Red Cross paramedics. By 1923, the mountain rescue service, known as the Bergwacht, comprised three departments, Munich, Allgäu and Chiemgau, and was tasked with providing "on the spot help for alpine rescue services".

Following the annexation of Austria in 1938, the Austrian rescue organisations were incorporated into the German Bergwacht. In 1939, the Bergwacht was also entrusted with nature conservation. In the further course of the Second World War the mountain rescue men were sworn in as auxiliary policemen. In 1944, the Bergwacht was placed under military authority. After the end of the Second World War, the Bergwacht was disbanded in the US occupation zone. The departments joined the respective regional associations of the German Red Cross. In the French occupation zone, the authorities approved the establishment of the independent Black Forest Bergwacht. In 1955, the Bergwacht state associations joined forces at federal level to form a working group. From this the Federal Committee for Mountain Rescue of the German Red Cross (DRK) emerged. The Black Forest Bergwacht was represented on this committee as a corporate member. Today the German mountain rescue service is a member of the International Commission for Alpine Mountain Rescue (IKAR).

== Organisation and state associations ==
The organisation of the Bergwacht is aligned to that of the German Red Cross. For example, the Bergwacht operates as part of the eleven DRK state associations. The Black Forest Mountain Rescue Service (Bergwacht Schwarzwald or BWS) has a special status. The BWS is a corporate member of the DRK State Association of the Baden Red Cross and at the same time an independent association and looks after mountain rescue on the territory of the Baden Red Cross (Black Forest).

The state associations:

- Bergwacht Bayern
- Bergwacht Harz (in the DRK state associations of Lower Saxony and Saxony-Anhalt)
- Bergwacht Hessen
- Bergwacht Nordrhein
- Bergwacht Rheinland-Pfalz
- Bergwacht Sachsen
- Bergwacht Schwarzwald
- Bergwacht Thüringen
- Bergwacht Westfalen-Lippe
- Bergwacht Württemberg

== See also ==
- Wolf-Dieter Montag, German mountain rescue doctor
- Mountain rescue
- Swiss Alpine Club
- Swiss Air Rescue
- Tyrolean Mountain Guards
