= Occupational crime =

Occupational crime is crime committed by an individual, or a group of individuals, through the opportunity created in the course of their employment. Unlike corporate crime or organizational crime, where the primary beneficiary is the employing organization, occupational crime is committed primarily for the personal gain, benefit or advancement of the offender.

== Definition and scope ==
Occupational crime occurs when an individual exploits the trust, authority or access granted to them by their employment to commit an illegal act. The defining characteristic of the offense is that the opportunity to commit the crime is intrinsically linked to the normal duties if the offender's occupation.

== Types of occupational crime ==
Occupational crimes can vary widely, depending on the industry level of access granted to the employee. These crimes can include embezzlement, misappropriation, fraud, information misuse, corruption, and bribery.

Examples of occupational crime
Category	Examples
Asset misappropriation	Embezzlement, payroll theft, inventory theft
Corruption	Bribery, kickbacks, conflicts of interest
Expense and reimbursement fraud	False travel claims, fictitious business expenses
Information crimes	Insider trading, trade-secret theft, misuse of confidential data

== Key characteristics ==
Criminologists generally identify several key elements that distinguish occupational crime from other types of offenses:

- Access and Trust: The perpetrator utilizes their legitimate professional access to physical assets, financial systems, or confidential data.
- Opportunity: The crime is facilitated by the normal environment and duties of the job, often exploiting gaps in oversight or internal controls.
- Concealment: The legitimate nature of the occupation provides a cover for the illicit activity, making detection difficult.
- Personal Benefit: The primary motivation and outcome of the crime is the enrichment or benefit of the individual offender; rather than for the organization where they work.

== Conceptual distinctions ==
The concept of occupational crime - as one of the principal forms of white-collar crime - has been quite familiar and widely invoked since the publication of Clinard and Quinney's influential Criminal Behavior Systems: A Typology.

More recently, however, the term occupational crime has been applied to activities quite removed from the original meaning of white collar crime, and it has been used interchangeably with such terms as occupational deviance and workplace crime. In the interest of greater conceptual clarity within the field of white collar crime the argument is made here for restricting the term 'occupational crime' to illegal and unethical activities committed for individual financial gain - or to avoid financial loss - in the context of a legitimate occupation.

The term 'occupational deviance' is better reserved for deviation from occupational norms (e.g. drinking on the job; sexual harassment), and the term 'workplace crime' is better reserved for conventional forms of crime committed in the workplace (e.g. rape; assault). The conceptual conflation of fundamentally dissimilar activities hinders theoretical, empirical, and policy-related progress in the field of white collar crime studies.

== Economic impact ==
According to the Association of Certified Fraud Examiners (ACFE) biennial global study, "Occupational Fraud: A Report to the Nations" in 2026, organizations lose an estimated 5% of their annual revenue to occupational fraud. The study examined 2,402 cases from 143 countries and territories. The median loss per case was $104,000, and the average loss per case was $1,457,000.

== Notable cases ==
=== Private sector ===
- Wells Fargo Cross Selling Scandal: Retail bank employees created millions of unauthorized deposit and credit card accounts. Employees exploited their occupational access to customer data to meet aggressive sales quotas to earn personal performance bonuses and avoid termination. This led to a $100 million settlement by the bank with the Consumer Financial Protection Bureau (CFPB) and the subsequent criminal prosecution of several mid-level managers.
- Société Générale Trading Loss: Trader Jérôme Kerviel exploited his prior knowledge of the bank's back-office systems to bypass internal controls. He executed approximately €4.9 billion in authorized speculative trades. While Kerviel initially claimed the trades were intended to benefit the bank, French courts convicted him of breach of trust, forgery, and unauthorized computer use, noting that the activity was driven to attain personal performance bonuses and career advancement.

=== Public sector ===
- Rod Blagojevich Corruption Charges: Former Illinois Governor Rod Blagojevich was convicted of attempting to sell the U.S. Senate seat vacated by Barack Obama. Blagojevich used his authority and access inherent in his elected office to solicit personal financial compensation and political appointments (such as a cabinet position or campaign funds) in exchange for the appointment.
- United Kingdom Parliamentary Expenses Scandal: Former Labour Party MP David Chaytor was convicted of false accounting for exploiting the trust and allowances inherent in his elected office. He fraudulently claimed £20,000 in parliamentary expenses to cover personal costs, including paying his wife's salary and personal television licenses. Chaytor was sentenced to an 18-month prison sentence.
- Rita Crundwell: Acting as comptroller of Dixon, Illinois, Rita Crundwell embezzled $53.7 million from the city for over 22 years to subsidize her horse breeding business and personal lifestyle. Crundwell was sentenced to 19 years and 7 months in prison.
