= Financial Police (Austria) =

The Financial Police (German: Finanzpolizei) are an Austrian civilian police force under the authority of the Austrian Ministry of Finance. It was founded in 2013 after the Zollwache (Customs guard) was dissolved in 2005.

== History ==
In October 1830 the predecessor organization was founded. During its existence the organization had different denominations like Gränzwache (Border guard), Finanzwache (Financial Guard) and until its liquidation in May 2004, Zollwache (Customs guard). The Italian Guardia di Finanza has its roots in the Austrian Finanzwache. The liquidation was conducted, due to the fact, that all neighbour states became members of the European Union or part of the European Economic Area and the Schengen Area.

On 1 July 2013 the Financial Police was founded as a uniformed law enforcement organisation to fight tax fraud, social fraud, illegal gambling, violation of both labour rights and employment regulations. Unlike the predecessor organization of the customs guards, the financial police are unarmed.

== Organization ==
Since January 1, 2021, the Financial Police has been a division of the Office for Fraud Prevention in the Ministry of Finance and has teams at every branch of the Austrian tax office. The Data, Information, and Processing Center (DIAC) of the Ministry is also integrated into the Financial Police. The DIAC is responsible for database research and analysis, providing information to tax authorities, and serves as a single point of contact for other agencies.

== Equipment of the Financial Police ==
=== Uniforms ===
The financial police officers officially use "service clothing" (uniforms). If the purpose of the application is required, financial police can also intervene in plain clothes. The uniform color of the Ministry of Finance is gray, combined with the red logo of the ministry and black applications.

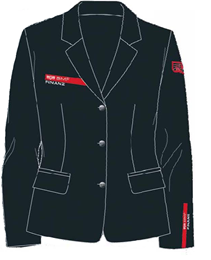
Uniform of the Financial Police

The standard adjustment consists of: beret, shirt (long / short sleeve), trousers, multi-purpose belt, and boots.

In addition, the following garments are used depending on the weather and application: pullover, fleece jacket, sleeveless vest, raincoat and trousers, safety vest, and protective gloves.

Following special clothing is provided: protective helmet, handcuffs, and safety shoes

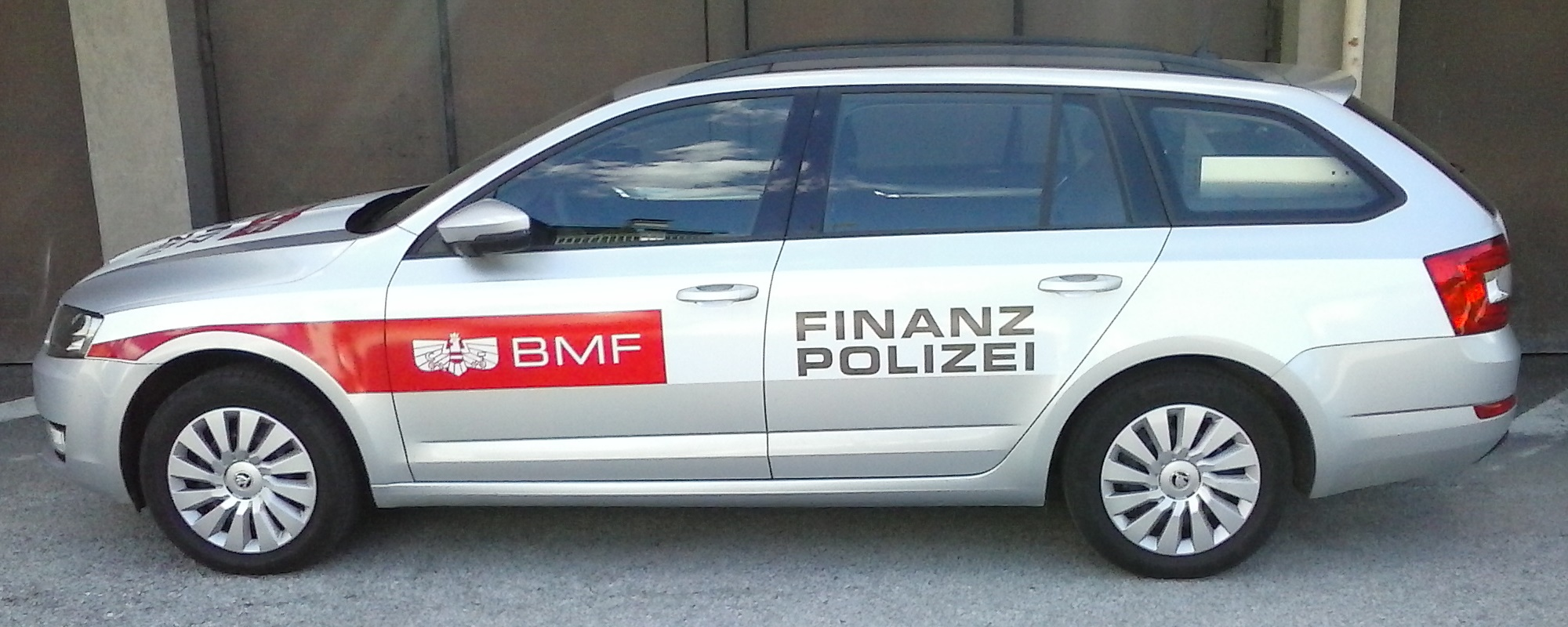
Car of the Financial Police

The institutions of the financial police have a service card which, on the front, contains the inscription "Dienstausweis Republik Österreich", the photograph of the servant, the designation "Finanzpolizei", the official number of the staff member and the period of validity. With the successful completion of basic training, each financial policeman will also receive a badge (service mark).

=== Financial Police Vehicles ===
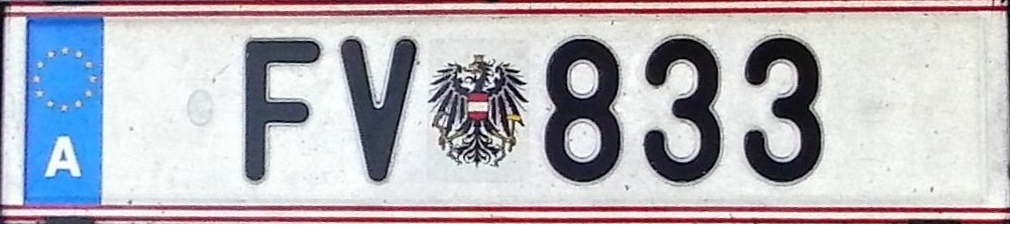
Vehicle registration plate, FV for Finanzverwaltung (financial administration)

The Financial Police have a partly labeled vehicle fleet of different vehicles. In addition to small buses, cars and all-wheel-drive vehicles are also used. The vehicles of the financial police are (partially) equipped with emergency vehicle equipment as well as stopping bars, for the use in the road traffic. Partially, the vehicles are also labeled "Finanzpolizei". If necessary, the office buses can be marked on the vehicle flanks by magnetic panels.

All vehicles use government vehicle registration plates with the abbreviation "FV" (for financial administration), the federal coat of arms and a three-digit number.

== See also ==
- Law enforcement in Austria
