= Law enforcement in Austria =

In Austria, law enforcement is the responsibility of the Directorate General for Public Security, a subdivision of the Federal Ministry of the Interior located at Herrengasse 7 in Vienna. Over 20,000 police officers are on duty in the Federal Police at more than 1,000 police stations. On lakes and rivers the federal police has over 70 boats and other craft to act as the water police.

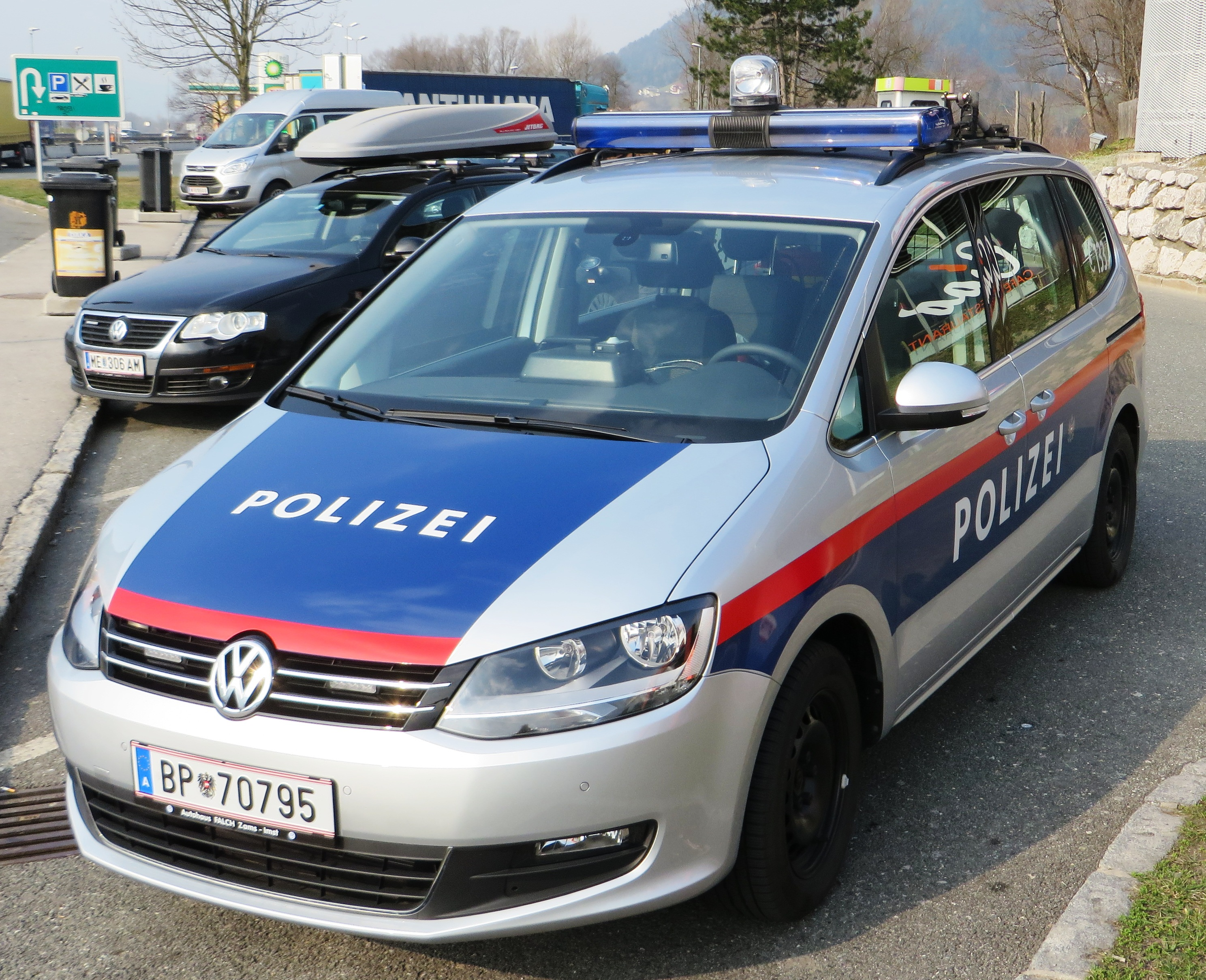
Federal Police Volkswagen Sharan

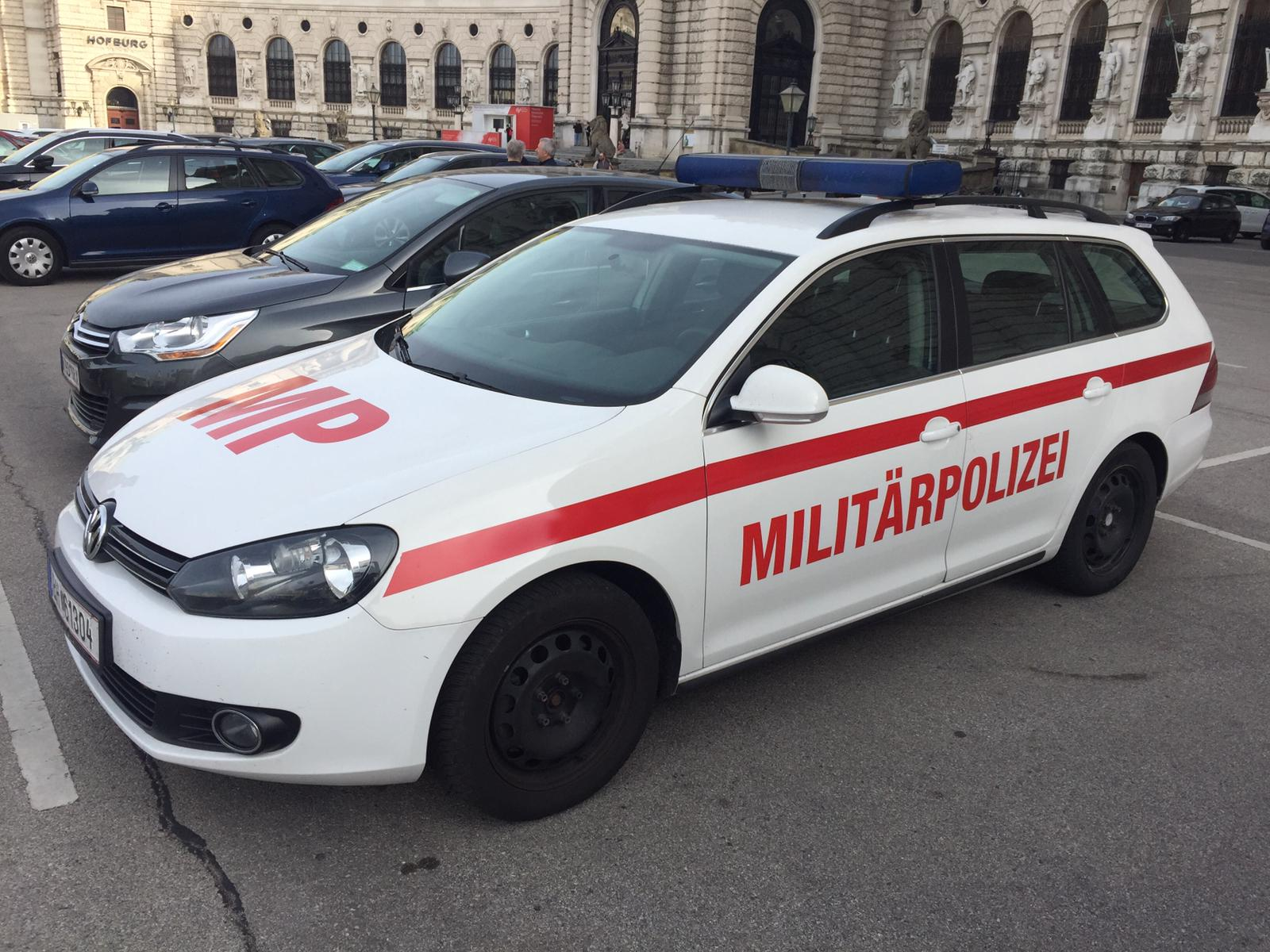
Military Police Volkswagen Golf

== Law enforcement agencies ==
=== Federal ===
==== Ministry of Defence ====
- Military Police (German: Militärpolizei): the military police of the Austrian Armed Forces

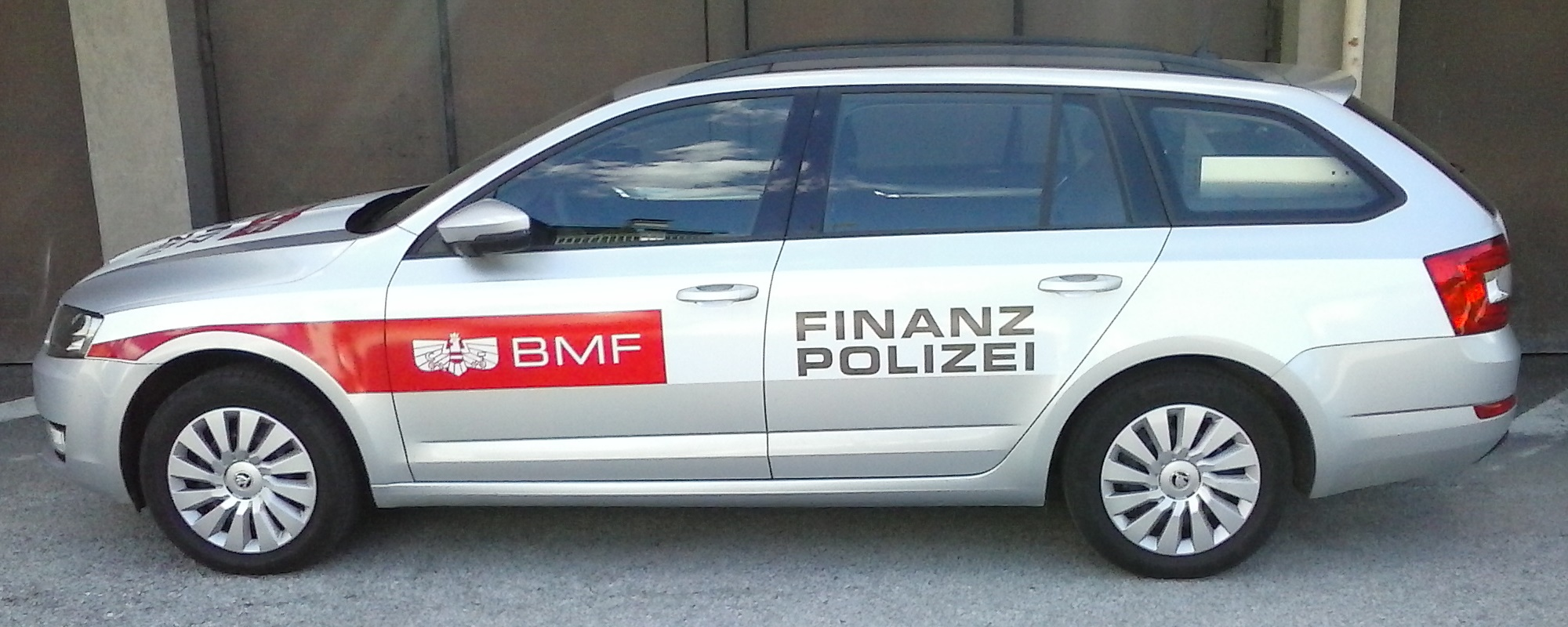
Financial Police Skoda Octavia

==== Ministry of Finance ====
- Financial Police (German: Finanzpolizei): the uniformed law enforcement arm of the Ministry of Finance
- Customs Service (German: Operative Zollaufsicht)

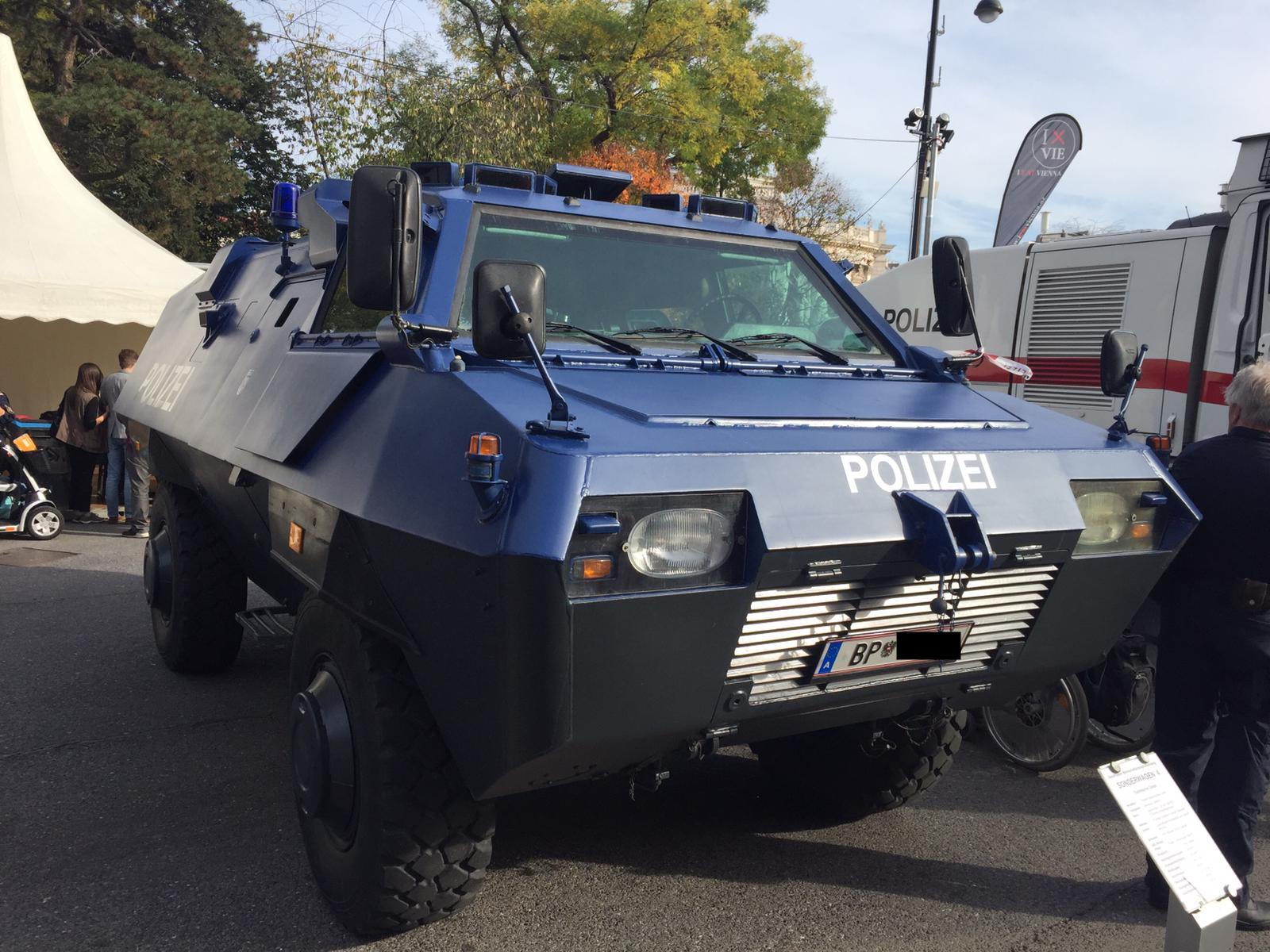
Armoured vehicle Sonderwagen 4 of the Federal Police

==== Ministry of the Interior ====
The Ministry of the Interior is responsible for:

- Federal Bureau of Anti-Corruption (German: Bundesamt zur Korruptionsprävention und Korruptionsbekämpfung)
- Directorate General for the Public Security (German: Generaldirektion für öffentliche Sicherheit (GDföS))
  - Criminal Police Office (German: Bundeskriminalamt (BK))
  - Federal Police (German: Bundespolizei): divided into 83 district police commands and 27 city police commands
  - Einsatzkommando Cobra (EKO Cobra): federal SWAT and special forces unit
  - Air Police (German: Flugpolizei): responsible for law enforcement in the air, including the provision of police helicopters

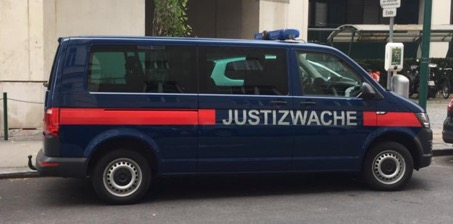
Standard vehicle of the Justizwache

==== Ministry of Justice ====
- Judicial Guard (German: Justizwache): responsible for running prisons and providing security at court facilities

=== State ===
In general, the nine States of Austria do not operate state law enforcement agencies, except in their specific areas of competence, namely nature conservation and wildlife protection.

- Tyrol
  - Tyrolean Mountain Guards (German: Tiroler Bergwacht) enforce conservation and wildlife protection laws in the state of Tyrol.
- Salzburg
  - Salzburg Mountain & Nature Guards (German: Salzburger Berg- und Naturwacht) enforce conservation and wildlife protection laws in the state of Salzburg.

=== Municipalities ===
Some Austrian municipalities operate a form of municipal law enforcement agency. In some municipalities, this is known as the City Police (German: Stadtpolizei), or sometimes Community Police (German: Gemeindepolizei) or Community Security Guard (German: Gemeindesicherheitswache). In others, responsibility for policing lies with the federal government and municipalities cannot call these agencies "police", instead naming them "order offices" (German: Ordnungsamt, Ordnungswache), similar in function to a bylaw enforcement officer or code enforcement. In some cases, these organisations are established as private corporations, owned by the municipality, such as the Security Service Limited (German: Ordnungsdienst der Stadt Linz GmbH) of Linz.

== Requirements for police officers ==
Police officers in Austria must meet certain requirements. These requirements include being at least 18 years of age, Austrian citizenship, an ability to act (not burdened by physical disability), impeccable reputation, Class B driver's licence, if conscripted to the armed forces, to have completed that conscription, and a swimming badge to prove swimming ability.

== See also ==
- Anti-corruption agency
- Crime in Austria
- List of law enforcement agencies
