= Health and safety crime in the United Kingdom =

Crimes that arise from failure to take care of health, safety or welfare at work

In the United Kingdom there are several crimes that arise from failure to take care of health, safety and welfare at work.

== Offences under the Health and Safety at Work etc. Act 1974 ==
All offences under the Act are triable summarily in a magistrates' court. However, some offences are triable on indictment in the Crown Court by judge and jury. If the magistrates feel that the offence is so serious as to exceed their sentencing powers, they can send it to the Crown Court for trial of for sentencing. The accused has a right to opt for Crown Court trial. Some other offences are only summarily triable. Either an individual or a corporation can be punished A corporation cannot be imprisoned, though an individual manager could be convicted if guilty of an offence.

The statutory offences and maximum penalties are:

Section	Offence	Maximum sentence on summary conviction	Maximum sentence on indictment
S.33(1)(a)	Failing to discharge a duty under: S.2 – Ensuring the health safety and welfare of employees S.3 – Avoiding risks to the health and safety of non-employees S.4 – Ensuring the safety of premises used for work S.5 – Preventing emission of noxious of offensive substances into the atmosphere S.6 – Ensuring the safety of articles used at work	Unlimited fine	Unlimited fine
S.33(1)(a)	Failing to discharge a duty under s.7 – Duty of employees to take care of safety	Unlimited fine	Unlimited fine
S.33(1)(b)	Contravention of: S.8 – Intentionally or recklessly interfering with or misusing anything provided in the interests of health, safety or welfare in pursuance of any of the relevant statutory provisions. S.9 – Charging employees for provision of health and safety facilities.	Unlimited fine	Unlimited fine
S.33(1)(c)	Contravention of any regulation	Unlimited fine	Unlimited fine
S.33(1)(d)	Failure of the Health and Safety Executive to hold an inquiry, or obstruction thereof, when directed by the Commission	Fine at Level 5 on the standard scale	—
S.33(1)(e)	Contravention of a requirement imposed by an inspector under s.20	Fine at Level 5 on the standard scale	—
S.33(1)(e)	Contravention of a requirement imposed by an inspector under s.25 (situations of imminent danger)	Unlimited fine	Unlimited fine
S.33(1)(f)	Preventing a person from appearing before an inspector	Fine at Level 5 on the standard scale	—
S.33(1)(g)	Contravening a requirement or prohibition imposed by an improvement or prohibition notice	Six months' imprisonment and unlimited fine	Two years' imprisonment and unlimited fine
S.33(1)(h)	Intentionally obstructing an inspector	Fine at Level 5 on the standard scale	—
S.33(1)(i)	Contravention of a requirement in a s.27(1) notice	Unlimited fine	Unlimited fine
S.33(1)(j)	Unauthorised disclosure of information by an inspector	Unlimited fine	Unlimited fine
S.33(1)(k)	Knowingly or recklessly making a false statement to an inspector	Unlimited fine	Unlimited fine
S.33(1)(l)	Intentionally making a false entry in a document required to be kept, with intent to deceive	Unlimited fine	Unlimited fine
S.33(1)(m)	Forging, using or possessing a document required by statute, with intent to deceive	Unlimited fine	Unlimited fine
S.33(1)(n)	Pretending to be an inspector	Unlimited fine	—
S.33(1)(o)	Failing to comply with a s.42 court order	Six months' imprisonment and unlimited fine	Two years' imprisonment and unlimited fine

Further, for offences triable on indictment, up to two years' imprisonment may be imposed on a guilty individual where there is (s.33(4)):

- Failure to operate with a license required by a regulation;
- Breach of a condition of such a license;
- An explosives offence contrary to statutory requirements.

These penalties are maxima and guideline sentencing practice is published by the Sentencing Guidelines Council. The maximum fines available for many regulation offences used to be relatively low at the magistrates court, however the Health and Safety (Offences) Act 2008, and Section 85 of the Legal Aid, Sentencing and Punishment of Offenders Act 2012 (which came into force on 16 January 2009 and 12 March 2015 respectively) had the effect of increasing the level of most fines available for magistrates’ courts to an unlimited fine (previously £20,000 for most health and safety offences). However, the increase will only apply in respect of offences committed after 12 March 2015.

Courts in England and Wales are able to order convicted persons to pay the costs of their prosecution. In general, courts will only award a nominal sum, not the full economic cost. However, in the specific case of health and safety prosecution, the court will award the totality of prosecution costs against the offender.

The Regulatory Enforcement and Sanctions Act 2008 will give a Minister of the Crown the power to introduce, by Statutory Instrument, a system of fixed penalty notices for the section 33 offences.

== Pre-1974 legislation ==
As of 2008, there are residual provisions of pre-1974 health and safety acts that still impose criminal responsibility, for example the Factories Act 1961 and the Offices, Shops and Railway Premises Act 1963. Breach of these residual provisions is still punishable on summary conviction in a magistrates' court by a fine of up to £400 or, on indictment in the Crown Court, imprisonment for up to two years and an unlimited fine.

== Fire Precautions Act 1971 ==
Many workplaces require fire certificates and use of premises without a certificate is a crime punishable, on summary conviction in a magistrates' court with a £400 fine, and on indictment in the Crown Court with an unlimited fine and up to two years' imprisonment. It is also an offence to forge a certificate or to give false information to an inspector. Offenders can, on summary conviction, be fined up to level 5 on the standard scale.

== Employers' Liability (Compulsory Insurance) Act 1969 ==
This Act requires that employers carry insurance against the personal injury of their employees. This insurance is referred to as Employer's Liability Compulsory Insurance (ELCI). As well as being insured, employers must post details of the insurance for staff to see. This requirement applies to most companies; exemptions include public organisations and certain micro companies. Offenders can be sentenced, on summary conviction in the Magistrates' Court, to a fine of up to level 4 on the standard scale.

== Offences under REACH ==
These European Union regulations are "directly applicable" to people and establishments in member states. They came into operation on 1 June 2008 and the government of the United Kingdom was required to have established penalties for any breach by 1 December 2008. The REACH Enforcement Regulations 2008 came into force on 1 December 2008, imposing penalties on summary conviction of fines up to the statutory maximum and up to three months' imprisonment, and on indictment of unlimited fines and up to two years' imprisonment.

== Manslaughter ==
Where an individual's breach of duty of care causes death and is so serious a breach that it ought to be considered criminal, an individual can be convicted on indictment of gross negligence manslaughter and sentenced to up to life imprisonment. From 6 April 2008, the offence of gross negligence manslaughter no longer applies to corporations.

== Corporate manslaughter and corporate homicide ==
On 6 April 2008, a new regime of corporate manslaughter came into effect in the UK. A corporation can be convicted on indictment and subjected to an unlimited fine in addition to having to put right its shortcomings and advertise its failures.

== Crown Censure ==
In the UK the Crown cannot be prosecuted for breaches of the law even where it has no exemption, such as from the Health and Safety at Work etc. Act. A Crown Censure is the method by which the Health and Safety Executive records, but for Crown immunity, there would be sufficient evidence to secure a conviction against the Crown.

== Bibliography ==
- [Various authors] (2007). Tolley's Health and Safety at Work Handbook 2008. London: Butterworths. ISBN 0-7545-3318-2.
- Lord Mackay of Clashfern (ed.) (2004) Halsbury's Laws of England, 4th ed. reissue, Vol.20(2), "Health and Safety at Work", 8.Criminal offences, 1035 - 1070
- Stranks, J. (2005). Health and Safety Law (5th ed.). London: Prentice Hall. ISBN 0-13-197646-X.
