= Breach of trust =

Breach of trust is a type of civil wrong in English trust law.

Breach of trust or Breach of Trust may also refer to:

== Films ==
- Breach of Trust, a.k.a. Crash, 1995 film starring Michael Biehn
- Breach of Trust (2017 film), a Cameroonian drama
- A Secret Life (film), a 1999 American made-for-TV film released in Britain as Breach of Trust
- Abuso de confianza (English title: Breach of Trust), a 1950 Argentine film

== Literature ==
- The Breach of Trust, an 1869 novel by Harriette Woods Baker
- Breach of Trust, a 1996 novel by Bonnie MacDougal
- Breach of Trust, a 1999 novel by Michael Kasner writing as Don Pendleton, the 39th installment in the Stony Man series
- Breach of Trust: How Washington Turns Outsiders Into Insiders, a 2003 book by U.S. Senator Tom Coburn
- Breach of Trust, a 2009 novel by DiAnn Mills
- Breach of Trust: How Americans Failed Their Soldiers and Their Country, a 2013 book by Andrew Bacevich
- Breach of Trust, a storyline in the comic book series Stormwatch: Post Human Division

== Other uses ==
- Criminal breach of trust in Singapore
- Breach of Trust (band), a Canadian rock band

== See also ==
- Breach of promise
- Breach of confidence
- Breach of contract
