= Crime =

Unlawful act punishable by an authority

Human civilisations throughout history have universally considered murder to be a crime.

In ordinary language, a crime is an unlawful act punishable by a state or other authority. The term crime does not, in modern criminal law, have any simple and universally accepted definition, though statutory definitions have been provided for certain purposes. The most popular view is that crime is a category created by law; in other words, something is a crime if declared as such by the relevant and applicable law. One proposed definition is that a crime or offence (or criminal offence) is an act harmful not only to some individual but also to a community, society, or the state ("a public wrong"). Such acts are forbidden and punishable by law.

The notion that acts such as murder, rape, and theft are to be prohibited exists worldwide. What precisely is a criminal offence is defined by the criminal law of each relevant jurisdiction. While many have a catalogue of crimes called the criminal code, in some common law nations no such comprehensive statute exists.

The state (government) has the power to severely restrict one's liberty for committing certain crimes. In most modern societies, there are procedures to which investigations and trials must adhere. If found guilty, an offender may be sentenced to a form of reparation such as a community sentence, or, depending on the nature of their offence, to undergo imprisonment, life imprisonment or, in some jurisdictions, death.

Usually, to be classified as a crime, the "act of doing something criminal" (actus reus) is accompanied by the "intention to do something criminal" (mens rea). Some criminal offenses are defined as strict liability crimes, meaning that the prosecution must prove the actus reus to secure a conviction, but is not required to establish any mens rea with respect to one or more elements of the offense.

While every crime violates the law, not every violation of the law counts as a crime. Breaches of private law (torts and breaches of contract) are not automatically punished by the state, but can be enforced through civil procedure.

== Definition ==
The exact definition of crime is a philosophical issue without an agreed upon answer. Fields such as law, politics, sociology, and psychology define crime in different ways. Crimes may be variously considered as wrongs against natural persons, legal persons, against the community, or against the state. The criminality of an action is dependent on its context; acts of violence will be seen as crimes in many circumstances but as permissible or desirable in others. Crime was historically seen as a manifestation of evil, but this has been superseded by modern criminal theories.

=== Legalism ===
Legal and political definitions of crime consider actions that are banned by authorities or punishable by law. Crime is defined by the criminal law of a given jurisdiction, including all actions that are subject to criminal procedure. There is no limit to what can be considered a crime in a legal system, so there may not be a unifying principle used to determine whether an action should be designated as a crime. From a legal perspective, crimes are generally wrong actions that are severe enough to warrant punishment that infringes on the perpetrator's liberties.

English criminal law and the related common law of Commonwealth countries can define offences that the courts alone have developed over the years, without any actual legislation: common law offences. The courts used the concept of malum in se to develop various common law offences.

=== Sociology ===
As a sociological concept, crime is associated with actions that cause harm and violate social norms. Under this definition, crime is a type of social construct, and societal attitudes determine what is considered criminal.

In legal systems based on legal moralism, the predominant moral beliefs of society determine the legal definition as well as the social definition of crime. This system is less prominent in liberal democratic societies that prioritize individualism and multiculturalism over other moral beliefs.

Paternalism defines crime not only as harm to others or to society, but also as harm to the self.

=== Psychology ===
Psychological definitions consider the state of mind of perpetrators and their relationship with their environment.

== Criminal law ==
Virtually all countries in the 21st century have criminal law grounded in civil law, common law, Islamic law, or socialist law. Historically, criminal codes have often divided criminals by class or caste, prescribing different penalties depending on status. In some tribal societies, an entire clan is recognized as liable for a crime. In many cases, disputes over a crime in this system lead to a feud that lasts over several generations.

=== Criminalization ===
The state determines what actions are considered criminal in the scope of the law. Criminalization has significant human rights considerations, as it can infringe on rights of autonomy and subject persons to unjust punishment.

=== Criminal procedure ===
Criminal procedure determines if a suspect actually committed the crime. Two forms of miscarriage of justice are the error of impunity and convicting innocent persons, which a majority of people tend to view as equally bad (Blackstone's ratio). When the perpetrator of a crime is found guilty of the crime, the state delivers a sentence to determine the penalty for the crime.

=== Liability ===
If a crime is committed, the person responsible is considered to be liable for the crime. For liability to exist, the person must be capable of understanding the criminal process and the relevant authority must have legitimate power to establish what constitutes a crime.

=== International criminal law ===
International criminal law typically addresses serious offenses, such as genocide, crimes against humanity, and war crimes. As with all international law, these laws are created through treaties and international custom, and they are defined through the consensus of the involved states. International crimes are not prosecuted through a standard legal system, though international organizations may establish tribunals to investigate and rule on egregious offenses such as genocide.

== Types ==
=== Blue-collar crime ===
Blue-collar crime is any crime committed by an individual from a lower social class as opposed to white-collar crime which is associated with crime committed by someone of a higher-level social class. These crimes are primarily small scale, for immediate beneficial gain to the individual or group involved in them. Examples of blue-collar crime include narcotic production and distribution, sexual assault, theft, burglary, assault or murder.

=== Child criminal exploitation ===
This term, as used in England and Wales (abbreviated to CCE), refers to actions where an individual or a group takes advantage of an imbalance of power to coerce, control, manipulate or deceive a child or young person aged under 18 into engaging in any criminal activity. Something that the victim needs or wants may be offered in exchange for the activity or it may be procured through violence or the threat of violence. The activity may appear to have consensual. The child may benefit financially from being involved.

Child criminal exploitation does not always involve physical contact; it can also occur through the use of technology.

England and Wales' safeguarding guidance warns that children who are exploited in this way are often seen as criminals in their own right and therefore "not treated as victims, despite the harm they have experienced". The same guidance adds that child criminal exploitation as experienced by girls may be "very different" from exploitation as experienced by boys.

=== Corporate crime ===
Corporate crime concerns financially motivated crime committed by legal or natural persons. Crimes of this nature are committed for and congruent with the goals of legitimate (i.e. registered) companies, such as safety crime or price fixing.

=== Inchoate crime ===
Inchoate crime is crime that is carried out in anticipation of other illegal actions but does not cause direct harm. Examples of inchoate crimes include attempt, conspiracy, and some types of corporate crime. Inchoate crimes are defined by substantial action to facilitate a crime with the intention of the crime's occurrence. This is distinct from simple preparation for or consideration of criminal activity. They are unique in that renunciation of criminal intention is generally enough to absolve the perpetrator of criminal liability, as their actions are no longer facilitating a potential future crime.

=== Political crime ===
Political crime is crime that directly challenges or threatens the state. Examples of political crimes include subversion, rebellion, treason, mutiny, espionage, sedition, terrorism, riot, and unlawful assembly. Political crimes are associated with the political agenda of a given state, and they are necessarily applied against political dissidents. Due to their unique relation to the state, political crimes are often encouraged by one nation against another, and it is political alignment rather than the act itself that determines criminality. State crime that is carried out by the state to repress law-abiding citizens may also be considered political crime.

=== Property crime ===
Common examples of property crime include burglary, theft, and vandalism.

Examples of financial crimes include counterfeiting, smuggling, tax evasion, and bribery. The scope of financial crimes has expanded significantly since the beginning of modern economics in the 17th century. In occupational crime, the complexity and anonymity of computer systems may help criminal employees camouflage their operations. The victims of the most costly scams include banks, brokerage houses, insurance companies, and other large financial institutions.

=== Public order crime ===
Public order crime is crime that violates a society's norms about what constitutes socially acceptable behavior. Examples of public order crimes include gambling, drug-related crime, public intoxication, prostitution, loitering, breach of the peace, panhandling, vagrancy, street harassment, excessive noise, and littering. Public order crime is associated with the broken windows theory, which posits that public order crimes increase the likelihood of other types of crime. Some public order crimes are considered victimless crimes in which no specific victim can be identified. Most nations in the Western world have moved toward decriminalization of victimless crimes in the modern era.

Adultery, fornication, blasphemy, apostasy, and invoking the name of God are commonly recognized as crimes in theocratic societies or those heavily influenced by religion.

=== Violent crime ===
Violent crime is crime that involves an act of violent aggression against another person. Common examples of violent crime include homicide, assault, sexual assault, and robbery. Some violent crimes, such as assault, may be committed with the intention of causing harm. Other violent crimes, such as robbery, may use violence to further another goal. Violent crime is distinct from noncriminal types of violence, such as self-defense, use of force, and acts of war. Acts of violence are most often perceived as deviant when they are committed as an overreaction or a disproportionate response to provocation.

=== White-collar crime ===
White-collar crime refers to financially motivated, nonviolent or non-directly violent crime committed by individuals, businesses and government professionals. The crimes are believed to be committed by middle- or upper-class individuals for financial gains. Typical white-collar crimes could include wage theft, fraud, bribery, Ponzi schemes, insider trading, labor racketeering, embezzlement, cybercrime, copyright infringement, money laundering, identity theft, and forgery.

== Participants ==
=== Criminal ===
A criminal is a natural person or legal person who commits a crime. What constitutes a criminal can vary depending on the context and the law, and it often carries a pejorative connotation. Criminals are often seen as embodying certain stereotypes or traits and are seen as a distinct type of person from law-abiding citizens. Despite this, no mental or physical trend is identifiable that differentiates criminals from non-criminals. Public response to criminals may be indignant or sympathetic. Indignant responses involve resentment and a desire for vengeance, wishing to see criminals removed from society or made to suffer for harm that they caused. Sympathetic responses involve compassion and understanding, seeking to rehabilitate or forgive criminals and absolve them of blame.

Historically, from ancient times until the 19th century, many societies believed that non-human animals were capable of committing crimes, and prosecuted and punished them accordingly. Prosecutions of animals gradually dwindled during the 19th century, although a few were recorded as late as the 1910s and 1920s.

=== Victim ===
A victim is a person who has been treated unjustly or made to suffer. In the context of crime, the victim is the person that is harmed by a violation of criminal law. Victimization is associated with post-traumatic stress and a long-term decrease in quality of life. Victimology is the study of victims, including their role in crime and how they are affected.

Several factors affect a person's likelihood of becoming a victim. Some factors may cause victims of crime to experience short-term or long-term "repeat victimization". Common long-term victims are those that have close relationships with the criminal, manifesting in crimes such as domestic violence, embezzlement, child abuse, and bullying. Repeat victimization may also occur when a potential victim appears to be a viable target, such as when indicating wealth in a less affluent region. Many of the traits that indicate criminality also indicate victimality; victims of crime are more likely to engage in unlawful behavior and respond to provocation. Overall demographic trends of victims and criminals are often similar, and victims are more likely to have engaged in criminal activities themselves.

The victims may only want compensation for the injuries suffered, while remaining indifferent to a possible desire for deterrence. Victims, on their own, may lack the economies of scale that could allow them to administer a penal system, let alone to collect any fines levied by a court.

== Crime statistics ==
Information and statistics about crime in a given jurisdiction are collected as crime estimates, typically produced by national or international agencies. Methods to collect crime statistics may vary, even between jurisdictions within the same nation. Under-reporting of crime is common, particularly in developing nations, resulting in the dark figure of crime. Victim studies may be used to determine the frequency of crime in a given population. The gap to official statistics is generally smaller with higher severity of the crime. Clearance rate measures the fraction of crimes where a criminal charge has been laid or the responsible person convicted. Fear of crime can be distinct from crime probability.

=== Public perception ===
Crime is often a high priority political issue in developed countries, regardless of the country's crime rates. People that are not regularly exposed to crime most often experience it through media, including news reporting and crime fiction. Exposure of crime through news stories is associated with alarmism and inaccurate perceptions of crime trends. Selection bias in new stories about criminals significantly over-represent the prevalence of violent crime, and news reporting will often overemphasize a specific type of crime for a period of time, creating a "crime wave" effect.

As public opinion of morality changes over time, actions that were once condemned as crimes may be considered justifiable.

== Causes and correlates ==
Criminal behavior determinants include cost–benefit analysis, opportunity or crime of passion. A person that commits a criminal act typically believes that its benefits will outweigh the risk of being caught and punished. Negative economic factors, such as unemployment and income inequality, can increase the incentive to commit crime, while severe punishments can deter crime in some cases.

Social factors similarly affect the likelihood of criminal activity. Crime corresponds heavily with social integration; groups that are less integrated with society or that are forcibly integrated with society are more likely to engage in crime. Involvement in the community, such as through a church, decreases the likelihood of crime, while associating with criminals increases the likelihood of becoming a criminal as well.

There is no known genetic cause of crime. Some genes have been found to affect traits that may incline individuals toward criminal activity, but no biological or physiological trait has been found to directly cause or compel criminal actions. One biological factor is the disparity between men and women, as men are significantly more likely to commit crimes than women in virtually all cultures. Crimes committed by men also tend to be more severe than those committed by women.

Crime distribution shows a long tail with a small fraction of individuals re-offending many times due to high recidivism, while onset of crime at younger age predicts a longer criminal career.

== Criminal justice ==
=== Natural-law theory ===
Justifying the state's use of force to coerce compliance with its laws has proven a consistent theoretical problem. One of the earliest justifications involved the theory of natural law. This posits that the nature of the world or of human beings underlies the standards of morality or constructs them. Thomas Aquinas wrote in the 13th century: "the rule and measure of human acts is the reason, which is the first principle of human acts". He regarded people as by nature rational beings, concluding that it becomes morally appropriate that they should behave in a way that conforms to their rational nature. Thus, to be valid, any law must conform to natural law and coercing people to conform to that law is morally acceptable. In the 1760s, William Blackstone described the thesis:

"This law of nature, being co-eval with mankind and dictated by God himself, is of course superior in obligation to any other. It is binding over all the globe, in all countries, and at all times: no human laws are of any validity, if contrary to this; and such of them as are valid derive all their force, and all their authority, mediately or immediately, from this original."

But John Austin (1790–1859), an early positivist, applied utilitarianism in accepting the calculating nature of human beings and the existence of an objective morality. He denied that the legal validity of a norm depends on whether its content conforms to morality. Thus, in Austinian terms, a moral code can objectively determine what people ought to do, the law can embody whatever norms the legislature decrees to achieve social utility, but every individual remains free to choose what to do. Similarly, H.L.A. Hart saw the law as an aspect of sovereignty, with lawmakers able to adopt any law as a means to a moral end.

Thus the necessary and sufficient conditions for the truth of a proposition of law involved internal logic and consistency, and that the state's agents used state power with responsibility. Ronald Dworkin rejects Hart's theory and proposes that all individuals should expect the equal respect and concern of those who govern them as a fundamental political right. He offers a theory of compliance overlaid by a theory of deference (the citizen's duty to obey the law) and a theory of enforcement, which identifies the legitimate goals of enforcement and punishment. Legislation must conform to a theory of legitimacy, which describes the circumstances under which a particular person or group is entitled to make law, and a theory of legislative justice, which describes the law they are entitled or obliged to make.

There are natural-law theorists who have accepted the idea of enforcing the prevailing morality as a primary function of the law. This view entails the problem that it makes any moral criticism of the law impossible: if conformity with natural law forms a necessary condition for legal validity, all valid law must, by definition, count as morally just. Thus, on this line of reasoning, the legal validity of a norm necessarily entails its moral justice.

=== Corrections and punishment ===
Authorities may respond to crime through corrections, carrying out punishment as a means to censure the criminal act. Retributive justice seeks to create a system of accountability and punish criminals in a way that knowingly causes suffering. This may arise out of a feeling that criminals deserve to suffer and that punishment should exist for its own sake. The existence of punishment also creates an effect of deterrence that discourages criminal action for fear of punishment.

Developed nations are less likely to use physical punishments. Instead, they will impose financial penalties or imprisonment. Whether a crime can be resolved through financial compensation varies depending on the culture and the specific context of the crime. Historically, many societies have absolved acts of homicide through compensation to the victim's relatives. In places with widespread impunity or limited rule of law, crime may be punished extralegally through mob rule and lynching.

== Crime prevention ==
=== Law enforcement ===
The enforcement of criminal law seeks to prevent crime and sanction crimes that do occur. This enforcement is carried out by the state through law enforcement agencies, such as police, which are empowered to arrest suspected perpetrators of crimes. Law enforcement may focus on policing individual crimes, or it may focus on bringing down overall crime rates. One common variant, community policing, seeks to prevent crime by integrating police into the community and public life.

Increased policing was found to decrease crime through deterrence, with an estimated elasticity -0.67 for murder and -0.56 for robbery according to a 2013 study.

=== Incapacitation ===
Incapacitation in the context of criminal sentencing philosophy is one of the functions of punishment. It involves capital punishment, sending an offender to prison, or possibly restricting their freedom in the community, to protect society and prevent that person from committing further crimes. Incarceration, as the primary mechanism for incapacitation, is also used in an effort to deter future offending.

=== Rehabilitation ===
Rehabilitation seeks to understand and mitigate the causes of a criminal's unlawful action to prevent recidivism. Different criminological theories propose different methods of rehabilitation, including strengthening social networks, reducing poverty, influencing values, and providing therapy for physical and mental ailments. Rehabilitative programs may include counseling or vocational education.

== Criminology ==
The study of crime is called criminology. Criminology addresses issues of social norms, social order, deviance, and violence. It includes the motivations and consequences of crime and its perpetrators, as well as preventative measures, either studying criminal acts on an individual level or the relationship of crime and the community. Due to the wide range of concepts associated with crime and the disagreement on a precise definition, the focus of criminology can vary considerably. Various theories within criminology provide different descriptions and explanations for crime, including social control theory, subcultural theory, strain theory, differential association, and labeling theory.

Subfields of criminology and related fields of study include crime prevention, criminal law, crime statistics, anthropological criminology, criminal psychology, criminal sociology, criminal psychiatry, victimology, penology, and forensic science. Besides sociology, criminology is often associated with law and psychology.

== History ==
=== Early history ===
Restrictions on behavior existed in all prehistoric societies. Crime in early human society was seen as a personal transgression and was addressed by the community as a whole rather than through a formal legal system, often through the use of custom, religion, or the rule of a tribal leader. Some of the oldest extant writings are ancient criminal codes. The earliest known criminal code was the Code of Ur-Nammu (c. 2100 – c. 2050 BC), and the first known criminal code that incorporated retaliatory justice was the Code of Hammurabi. The latter influenced the conception of crime across several civilizations over the following millennia.

The Romans systematized law and applied their system across the Roman Empire. The initial rules of Roman law regarded assaults as a matter of private compensation. The most significant Roman law concept involved dominion. Most acts recognized as crimes in ancient societies, such as violence and theft, have persisted to the modern era. The criminal justice system of Imperial China existed unbroken for over 2,000 years.

Many of the earliest conceptions of crime are associated with sin and corresponded to acts that were believed to invoke the anger of a deity. This idea was further popularized with the development of the Abrahamic religions. The understanding of crime and sin were closely associated with one another for much of history, and conceptions of crime took on many of the ideas associated with sin. Islamic law developed its own system of criminal justice as Islam spread in the seventh and eighth centuries.

=== Post-classical era ===
In post-classical Europe and East Asia, central government was limited and crime was defined locally. Towns established their own criminal justice systems, while crime in the countryside was defined by the social hierarchies of feudalism. In some places, such as the Russian Empire and the Kingdom of Italy, feudal justice survived into the 19th century.

Common law first developed in England under the rule of Henry II in the 12th century. He established a system of traveling judges that tried accused criminals in each region of England by applying precedent from previous rulings. Legal developments in 12th century England also resulted in the earliest known recording of official crime data.

=== Modern era ===
In the modern era, crime came to be seen as an issue affecting society rather than conflicts between individuals. Writers such as Thomas Hobbes saw crime as a societal issue as early as the 17th century. Imprisonment developed as a long-term penalty for crime in the 18th century. Increasing urbanization and industrialization in the 19th century caused crime to become an immediate issue that affected society, prompting government intervention in crime and the establishment of criminology as its own field.

Anthropological criminology was popularized by Cesare Lombroso in the late-19th century. This was a biological determinist school of thought based in social darwinism, arguing that certain people are naturally born as criminals. The eugenics movement of the early-20th century similarly held that crime was caused primarily by genetic factors.

The concept of crime underwent a period of change as modernism was widely accepted in the years following World War II. Crime increasingly came to be seen as a societal issue, and criminal law was seen as a means to protect the public from antisocial behavior. This idea was associated with a larger trend in the western world toward social democracy and centre-left politics.

Through most of history, reporting of crime was generally local. The advent of mass media through radio and television in the mid-20th century allowed for the sensationalism of crime. This created well-known stories of criminals such as Jeffrey Dahmer, and it allowed for dramatization that perpetuates misconceptions about crime. Forensic science was popularized in the 1980s, establishing DNA profiling as a new method to prevent and analyze crime.

== See also ==
- Crime displacement – Relocation of crime following police efforts
- Crime hotspots – Areas that have a higher-than-average level of criminal activity
- Law and order (politics) – Demands for a strict criminal justice system
- Organized crime – Structured criminal groups
- Rule of law – Political situation in which everyone is subject to the law
- True Crime Community – Online crime fandom
