= Bonnie MacDougal =

American novelist

Bonnie MacDougal is the author of four novels that draw extensively from her own life as a lawyer working in Philadelphia.

She received her undergraduate degree from Bryn Mawr College, magna cum laude with Honors in English literature, and her law degree from the University of Pennsylvania.

Her law career took her to Anchorage, Alaska, and Little Rock, Arkansas (where she was one of the few lawyers ever to practice with Bill Clinton), then back to Philadelphia and the firms of Schnader, Harrison, Segal & Lewis, and Pepper Hamilton LLP, where she practices today. Her specialty is complex commercial litigation, including bankruptcy, securities fraud, and intellectual property disputes.

She made her literary debut in 1996 with the publication of Breach of Trust, described as "an extraordinarily accomplished first novel". Her second book was Angle of Impact, a thriller about an aviation disaster, which was described as "a deliciously complicated puzzle" and "one hot read". Her third novel, Out of Order, is the story of a young woman with a secret past who is unwillingly thrust into the limelight when her husband runs for Congress. Out of Order was called "much more than an ordinary legal thriller. It's an ambitious, superbly crafted tale". Another critic wrote: "MacDougal is no female Grisham. She’s more like Scott Turow, a much better lawyer-writer whose characters come loaded with plenty of history". Her fourth novel is Common Pleas, a story of young lovers on trial for the murder of the girl's wealthy parents. Her books have been translated into eight foreign languages.
