= Censure =

Expression of strong disapproval or harsh criticism

A censure is an expression of strong disapproval or harsh criticism. In parliamentary procedure, it is a debatable main motion that could be adopted by a majority vote. Among the forms that it can take are a stern rebuke by a legislature, a spiritual penalty imposed by a church, or a negative judgement pronounced on a theological proposition. It is usually non-binding (requiring no compulsory action from the censured party), unlike a motion of no confidence (which may require the referenced party to resign).

== Parliamentary procedure ==
=== Explanation and use ===
Censure (main motion)
- Requires second?: Yes
- Debatable?: Yes
- Amendable?: Yes
- Vote required: Majority

The motion to censure is a main motion expressing a strong opinion of disapproval that could be debated by the assembly and adopted by a majority vote. According to Robert's Rules of Order (Newly Revised) (RONR), it is an exception to the general rule that "a motion must not use language that reflects on a member's conduct or character, or is discourteous, unnecessarily harsh, or not allowed in debate." Demeter's Manual notes, "It is a reprimand, aimed at reformation of the person and prevention of further offending acts." While there are many possible grounds for censuring members of an organization, such as embezzlement, absenteeism, drunkenness, and so on, the grounds for censuring a presiding officer are more limited:

Serious grounds for censure against presiding officers (presidents, chairmen, etc.) are, in general: arrogation or assumption by the presiding officer of dictatorial powers – powers not conferred upon him by law – by which he harasses, embarrasses and humiliates members; or, specifically: (1) he refuses to recognize members entitled to the floor; (2) he refuses to accept and to put canonical motions to vote; (3) he refuses to entertain appropriate appeals from his decision; (4) he ignores proper points of order; (5) he disobeys the bylaws and the rules of order; (6) he disobeys the assembly's will and substitutes his own; (7) he denies to members the proper exercise of their constitutional or parliamentary rights.

More serious disciplinary procedures may involve fine, suspension, or expulsion. In some cases, the assembly may declare the chair vacant and elect a new chairman for the meeting; or a motion can be made to permanently remove an officer (depending on the rules of the assembly).

=== Procedure ===
If the motion is made to censure the presiding officer, then he must relinquish the chair to the vice-president until the motion is disposed. But during this time, the vice-president is still referred to as "Mr. Vice President" or "Ms. Vice President" in debate, since a censure is merely a warning and not a proceeding that removes the president from the chair. An officer being censured is not referred to by name in the motion, but simply as "the president", "the treasurer", etc.

After a motion to censure is passed, the chair (or the vice-president, if the presiding officer is being censured) addresses the censured member by name. He may say something to the effect of, "Brother F, you have been censured by vote of the assembly. A censure indicates the assembly's disapproval of your conduct". ([at meetings.] This phrase should not be included as the cause for censure may have occurred outside of meetings.) "A censure is a warning. It is the warning voice of suspension or expulsion. Please take due notice thereof and govern yourself accordingly." Or, if the chair is being censured, the vice-president may say, "Mr. X, you have been censured by the assembly for the reasons contained in the resolution. I now return to you the presidency."

== Politics ==
In politics, a censure is an alternative to more serious measures against misconduct or dereliction of duty.

=== Canada ===
Censure is an action by the House of Commons or the Senate rebuking the actions or conduct of an individual. The power to censure is not directly mentioned in the constitutional texts of Canada but is derived from the powers bestowed upon both Chambers through section 18 of the Constitution Act, 1867. A motion of censure can be introduced by any Member of Parliament or Senator and passed by a simple majority for censure to be deemed to have been delivered. In addition, if the censure is related to the privileges of the Chamber, the individual in question could be summoned to the bar of the House or Senate (or, in the case of a sitting member, to that member's place in the chamber) to be censured, and could also face other sanctions from the house, including imprisonment. Normally, censure is exclusively an on-the-record rebuke — it is not equivalent to a motion of no confidence, and a prime minister can continue in office even if censured.

Louis Riel faced Parliamentary censure for his role in the Red River Rebellion, and was expelled from Parliament 16 April 1874.

=== Japan ===
In Japan, a censure motion is a motion that can be passed by the House of Councillors, the upper house of the National Diet. No-confidence motions are passed in the House of Representatives, and this generally does not happen as this house is controlled by the ruling party. On the other hand, censure motions have been passed by opposition parties several times during the Democratic Party of Japan (DPJ) administrations from 2009. The motions were combined with a demand from the opposition to take a certain action, and a refusal to cooperate with the ruling party on key issues unless some actions were taken.

For example, on 20 April 2012 the opposition Liberal Democratic Party (LDP), Your Party and New Renaissance Party submitted censure motions against ministers of Prime Minister Yoshihiko Noda's Democratic Party of Japan-controlled cabinet. They censured Minister of Defense Naoki Tanaka and Minister of Land Takeshi Maeda, and refused to cooperate with the government on passing an increase to Japan's consumption tax from 5% to 10%. Noda had "staked his political life" on passing the consumption tax increase, so on 4 June 2012, Noda reshuffled his cabinet and replaced Tanaka and Maeda.

On 28 August 2012, a censure motion was passed by the LDP and the New Komeito Party against Prime Minister Noda himself. The opposition parties were to boycott debate in the chamber, it means that bills passed in the DPJ-controlled House of Representatives cannot be enacted.

=== Australia ===
The Senate, the upper house of the Australian Parliament, has censured two Prime Ministers in recent decades that of Paul Keating and John Howard.

The Australian Attorney General George Brandis was censured on 2 March 2015 for his treatment of Human Rights Commission President Gillian Triggs.

Senator for Queensland Fraser Anning was censured for remarks he made about the Christchurch mosque shootings.

Former Prime Minister Scott Morrison was censured by the Australian House of Representatives on 30 November 2022 for secretly taking on the powers of additional ministries.

Former Australian Greens Senator Lidia Thorpe was threatened to face a censure motion in early 2023 over her undisclosed relationship with a bikie boss. The motion was backed by the Coalition and One Nation, with the Labor Party considering backing the motion. She was subsequently censured on 18 November 2024 for heckling the King of Australia, King Charles III.

Australian Greens Senator Janet Rice was censured by the Australian Senate over protesting during a special address to the Australian Parliament by Philippine President Bongbong Marcos.

=== United Kingdom ===
In the UK the Crown cannot be prosecuted for breaches of the law even where it has no exemption, such as from the Health and Safety at Work etc. Act. A Crown Censure is the method by which the Health and Safety Executive records that, but for Crown immunity, there would be sufficient evidence to secure a H&S conviction against the Crown.

=== United States ===
Censure is the public reprimanding of a public official or political party representative for inappropriate conduct or voting behavior. When the president is censured, it serves only as a condemnation and has no direct effect on the validity of presidency, nor are there any other particular legal consequences. Unlike impeachment, censure has no basis in the Constitution or in the rules of the Senate and House of Representatives. It expresses the formal condemnation of either congressional body, or of a political party, of one of their own members.

== Catholic Church ==
=== Canon law ===
In Catholic canon law, a censure is a penalty imposed primarily for the purpose of breaking contumacy and reintegrating the offender in the community.

The ecclesiastical censures are excommunication and interdict, which can be imposed on any member of the Church, and suspension, which only affects clerics.

=== Theological censure ===
In Catholic theology, a theological censure is a doctrinal judgment by which the church stigmatizes certain teachings detrimental to faith or morals.

== See also ==
- Impeachment
- Motion of no confidence
- Political crime
