= Safety crime =

Safety crime refers to health and safety transgressions resulting from financially motivated acts or omissions congruent with the goals of legitimate organisations. Leading academics concur that the fatalities and social harms of safety crime rival, and likely exceed, those of traditional violent crimes such as homicide. Many safety crimes go unnoticed and unpunished, thereby contributing to the hidden figure of crime.

Safety crime is a sub-category of corporate crime, as the latter refers to all - not just violent - financial crime congruent with the goals of legitimate organisations, like price fixing. Safety crime was termed by Tombs and Whyte in 2007 in their United Kingdom centric analysis of the legal regulation and punishment of workplace health and safety offences. Tombs and Whyte briefly define safety crime as "violations of law by employers that either do, or have the potential to, cause sudden death or injury as a result of work-related activities". These violations include a broad range of civil law and criminal law offences, such as strict liability and manslaughter, and are committed by legal and natural persons. Most safety crimes are strongly associated with rational choice theory by way of cost-benefit analyses.

== Safety crime cases ==
The following examples are cited as high profile archetypal safety crimes in the academic literature. In 1970s North America the Ford Pinto auto-mobile attracted media and government scrutiny after several deadly fires occurred when the fuel-tank ruptured in rear-end collisions. The Ford Motor Company was accused of being aware of the car's unsafe fuel-tank placement and forgoing design changes based on an internal cost-benefit analysis. Consequently, there were multiple successful lawsuits against the Ford Motor Company, most notably the two landmark legal cases Grimshaw v. Ford Motor Co. and Indiana v. Ford Motor Co.

In October 1999 London, United Kingdom, the Ladbroke Grove rail crash caused 31 deaths and injured over 400 people. The Health and Safety Commission’s inquiry concluded that poor signal sighting led the train driver to erroneously proceed through a stop signal and collide with another train. Concerns had previously been raised with the signal in question because it had caused eight similar instances over six years of train drivers erroneously passing the stop signal due to poor visibility. During this time the train provider, Thames Trains, decided not to install a fail-safe system that would have automatically applied the train brakes if drivers mistakenly ignored the stop signal. This decision arose from a cost-benefit analysis that the costs outweighed the safety benefits.

December 1999 marked a significant moment for corporate liability in Scotland. A gas explosion resulted in the deaths of a family of four, leading to the successful prosecution of Transco, a public gas utility company part of the National Grid plc, in Transco plc v HM Advocate. The Health and Safety Executive investigated the explosion and subsequently prosecuted Transco for culpable homicide, fining the company £15 million.

== Defining safety crime ==
Since Sutherland highlighted the concept of crime in business in the 1940s, crimes of this nature are usually contested and marginalised in academic, political, and public discourse, as discourse typically focuses on traditional street crimes like assault. At the time, for instance, Tappan disagreed with Sutherland's white-collar crime concept on the grounds that Sutherland used the criminal label before official adjudication, and therefore entered a sphere of moralising that clashed with the legal system.

The 1972 Watergate scandal prompted a re-emergence of academic literature on business-related crime. Throughout the 1970s to 1990s academics pursued occupational crime, economic crime, organized crime, commercial crime, crimes at the top, crimes of the powerful crimes in the suites, elite deviance, crimes of capital, business crime, organisational crime, and corporate crime. Almost all of these concepts refer to different types of crime in the workplace.

Alongside Tombs and Whyte defining safety crimes as deaths or injuries resulting from work-related activities, they use Pearce and Tombs' corporate crime definition to define safety crime as:

Illegal acts or omissions, punishable by the state under administrative, civil or criminal law which are the result of deliberate decision making or culpable negligence within a legitimate formal organisation. These acts or omissions are based in legitimate, formal, business organisations, made in accordance with the normative goals, standard operating procedures, and/or cultural norms of the organisation, and are intended to benefit the corporation itself.

By referring to sudden death or injury, this safety crime definition excludes workplace health and safety transgressions that cause pernicious harms from illnesses and diseases. Tombs and Whyte separate occupational injury from occupational health harms due to their disparate nature and symptoms. That is, injuries are more identifiable and accountable than health harms. Health issues typically involve a more complex contestable causal chain over a long period of time. In legal terms it is easier to achieve the burden of proof for occupational injuries than occupational health harms.

Tombs and Whyte's introduction of the safety crime term has not achieved widespread recognition in academic, political, or public discourse. The term safety crime has only been used by Alvesalo and Whyte, Tombs and Whyte, and Alvesalo et al. When studies refer to workplace health and safety offences, they are more likely to use the term corporate crime and thereby also inadvertently refer to financial crime, state crime, or environmental crime.

== Safety crime injury statistics ==
In 2023 the International Labour Organisation estimated that every year 2.93 million workers die as a result of work-related factors, alongside 395 million non-fatal workplace injuries, and $361 billion in costs from injuries and excessive heat in the workplace. In 2017 Hämäläinen noted that most work-related deaths occur in Asia, which had 12.99 fatalities per 100,000 persons employed, followed by America and Europe with fatality rates of 5.12 and 3.02 respectively per 100,000 persons employed.

=== Great Britain/United Kingdom ===
In Great Britain the Health and Safety Executive reported that in 2024–25 124 employees and 92 members of the public died from work-related incidents. The Health and Safety Executive also recorded that in 2023/24 there were:

- 1.7 million working people suffering from a work-related illness, of which
  - 776,000 workers suffering work-related stress, depression or anxiety
  - 543,000 workers suffering from a work-related musculoskeletal disorder
- 2,218 mesothelioma deaths due to past asbestos exposures
- 61,663 injuries to employees reported under the Reporting of Injuries, Diseases and Dangerous Occurrences Regulations
- 33.7 million working days lost due to work-related illness and workplace injury
- £21.6 billion estimated cost of injuries and ill health from current working conditions in 2022/23

However, safety crime academics criticise the Health and Safety Executive because it 'omits vast swathes of fatal injuries'. Tombs and Whyte argue there are at least 900 safety crime deaths each year in Great Britain, this being seven times larger than the Health and Safety Executive's 2024-25 headline fatality figure of employee deaths. Furthermore, in contrast to Health and Safety Executive statistics, the Labour Force Survey consistently estimates significantly higher quantities of non-fatal injuries. In 2023/24 the Labour Force Survey reported 604,000 workplace non-fatal injuries, nearly 10 times as many injuries reported by the Health and Safety Executive.

Alongside this, in 2022 the Office for Health Improvement and Disparities stated that there are between 28,000 and 36,000 annual mortalities from human-made air pollution in the UK.

== Safety crime obscurity ==
Virtually all safety crime academics agree that safety crimes are obscured and marginalised in modern societies. Termed a ‘collective ignorance’ by Box, this type of crime likely comprises the hidden figure of crime. In the United Kingdom the Parliamentary safety and health at work report, which significantly influenced the Health and Safety at Work Act 1974, acknowledged the issue of safety crime under-reporting. In 2007 the Health and Safety Executive estimated that employers recorded 30% of employee injuries, rising to 50% of non-fatal injuries in 2024. The Reporting of Injuries, Diseases and Dangerous Occurrences Regulations 2013 excludes the Health and Safety Executive from recording deaths from sea fishing and merchant vessels, deaths travelling by air or sea, and most significant, deaths involving a moving vehicle on a public road (other than vehicles involved in loading and unloading operations, working alongside the road such as road maintenance, escapes of substances from vehicles, and incidents involving trains). In 2003 the Health and Safety Executive estimated that a third of all road traffic incidents in Britain are work-related, resulting in approximately 1,000 fatalities each year. More recently in 2024 The Royal Society for the Prevention of Accidents corroborated the Health and Safety Executive's suggestion that one third of all road traffic fatalities are work-related, resulting in approximately 500 deaths each year.

The under-reporting of safety crime can be ascribed to various obstacles of identifying and convicting those responsible for safety crime. This includes:

- the way in which many safety crimes are represented as accidents or non-work related deaths rather than crimes of violence.
- legal obstacles of identifying, regulating and convicting those responsible for safety crime.
- the safety crime subject fails to attract mainstream academic, political, or public attention. This can be ascribed to the politics of crime, law and order. Issues of criminalising the powerful - such as resourceful corporations or high status individuals - are well documented.

== See also ==
- Health and safety crime in the United Kingdom
- Health and safety regulations in the United Kingdom
- Corporate manslaughter in English law
- Zemiology
