= Crime in Austria =

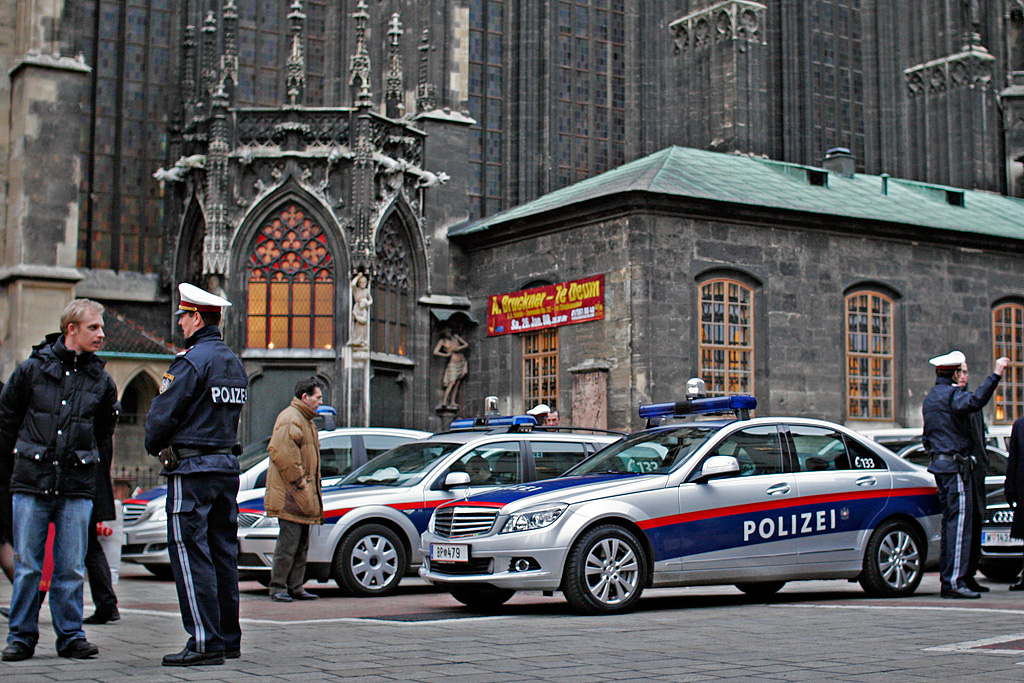
Austrian police in front of Stephansdom in Vienna.

Crime in Austria is combated by a range of Austrian law enforcement agencies.

== Crime by type ==
=== Murder ===
In 2017, Austria (with a population of about 8.795 million) had an intentional homicide rate of 0.61 per 100,000 population - one of the lowest rates in the world. There were a total of 54 intentional homicides in Austria in 2017.

=== Theft ===
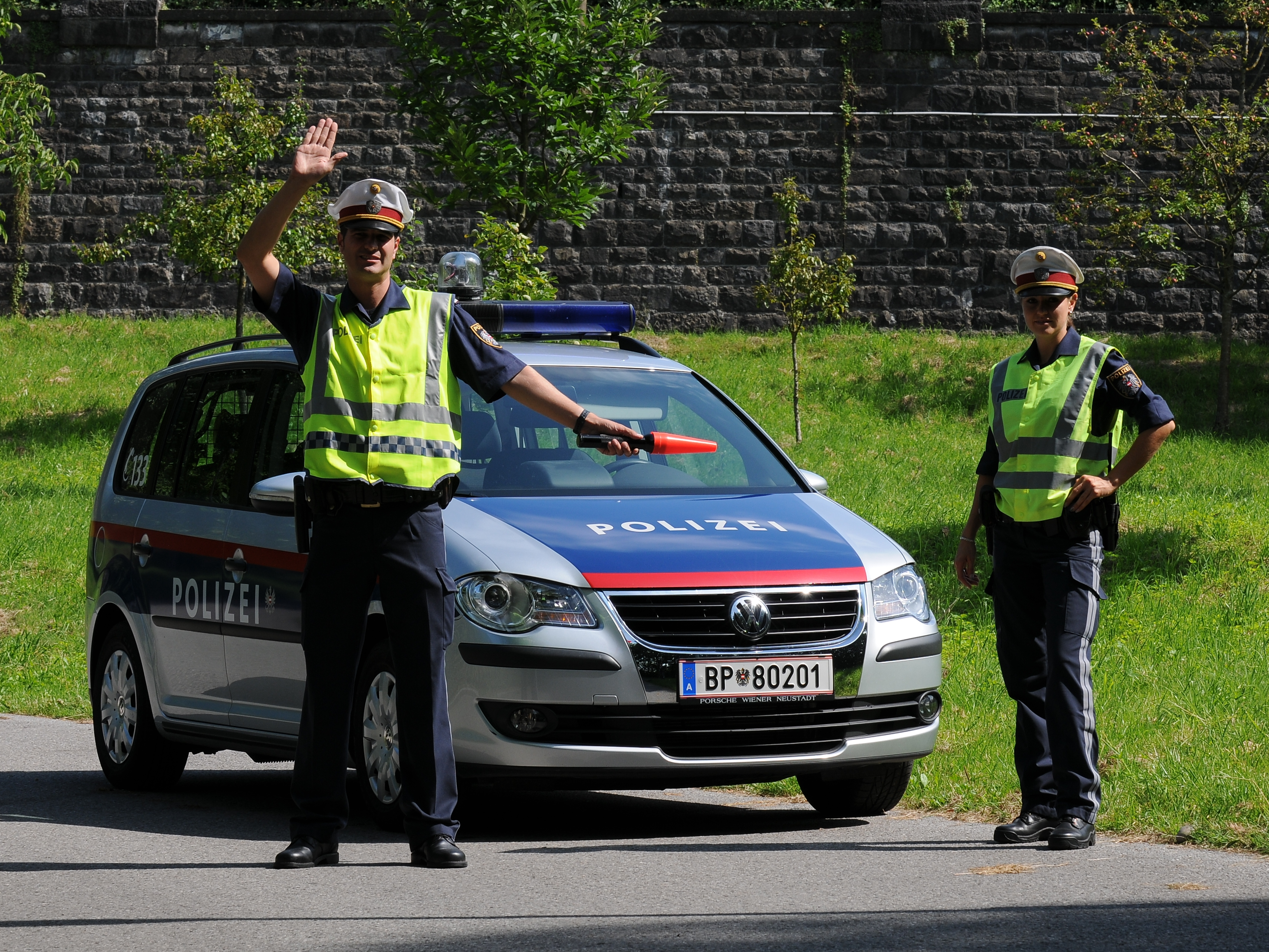
Austrian police at a traffic stop.

Pickpockets and purse snatchers can be found in the highly populated areas, including areas frequented by tourists, bus and train stations, and on subways. Residential burglaries are a significant concern, especially in the more affluent areas. The US government rates Vienna as being "medium" for levels of residential crime.

In 2004 Austria had the lowest rates of car theft in the EU.

=== Corruption ===
Austria has a well-developed institutional and legal system, and most corruption cases under investigation by a parliamentary committee end with judicial trials and effective judgments. Several significant Austrian corruption cases took place during the 2000s involving land and regional officials, high-level public officials, the central government and, in one instance, the former Chancellor.

In most cases, corrupt practices were related to conflicts of interest, abuse of office, money laundering and influence peddling. The corruption scandals have put into doubt the ethical standards of the political elite. This doubt is reflected in the findings of Eurobarometer 2012, where two-thirds of respondents perceive national politicians to be corrupt and also the most corrupt institution in Austria.

=== Terrorism ===
There have been several terrorist attacks in Austria, in the last years.

== Crime dynamics ==
Austria is targeted by foreign criminals, with 64 percent of drug-related offences being carried out by criminals who are born abroad. According to British criminal Colin Blaney in his autobiography Undesirables, British thieves and confidence tricksters have targeted Austria because it is viewed as a soft touch due to its relatively low crime rates.

== By location ==
Most criminal activity is focused in the larger metropolitan areas.
