= Force (law) =

Legal concept

In law, force means lawful violence, or lawful compulsion. "Forced entry" is an expression falling under the category of unlawful violence; "in force" or "forced sale" would be examples of expressions in the category of lawful compulsion.

When something is said to have been done "by force", it usually implies that it was done by actual or threatened violence ("might"), not necessarily by legal authority ("right").

"Force of arms" is a special case that can be an example of unlawful violence or lawful compulsion dependent on who is exercising the violence (or threat thereof) and their legal right and/or responsibility to do so.

When one citizen threatens another with a weapon without being in danger from the person he or she is threatening, this would be an example of the unlawful expression of force of arms. The same threat expressed by police officer making a lawful arrest would typically be considered lawful compulsion, due to the state having a monopoly on violence.

== Indian Penal Code ==
In Indian Penal Code, Section 349 explains the meaning of force as under:- 'A person is said to use force to another if he causes motion, change of motion, or cessation of motion to that other, or if he causes to any substance such motion, or change of motion, or cessation of motion as brings that substance into contact with any part of that other's body, or with anything which that other is wearing or carrying, or with anything so situated that such contact affects that other's sense of feeling: Provided that the person causing the motion, or change of motion, or cessation of motion, causes that motion, change of motion, or cessation of motion in one of the three ways hereinafter described. (First) — By his own bodily power. (Secondly) —By disposing any substance in such a manner that the motion or change or cessation of motion takes place without any further act on his part, or on the part of any other person. (Thirdly) — By inducing any animal to move, to change its motion, or to cease to move.'

== See also ==
- Coming into force
- Power (social and political)
- Police power
- Use of force
- Economic power
