= 1778 in Austria =

- Decades: 1780s; 1790s
- See also: Other events of 1778; List of years in Austria

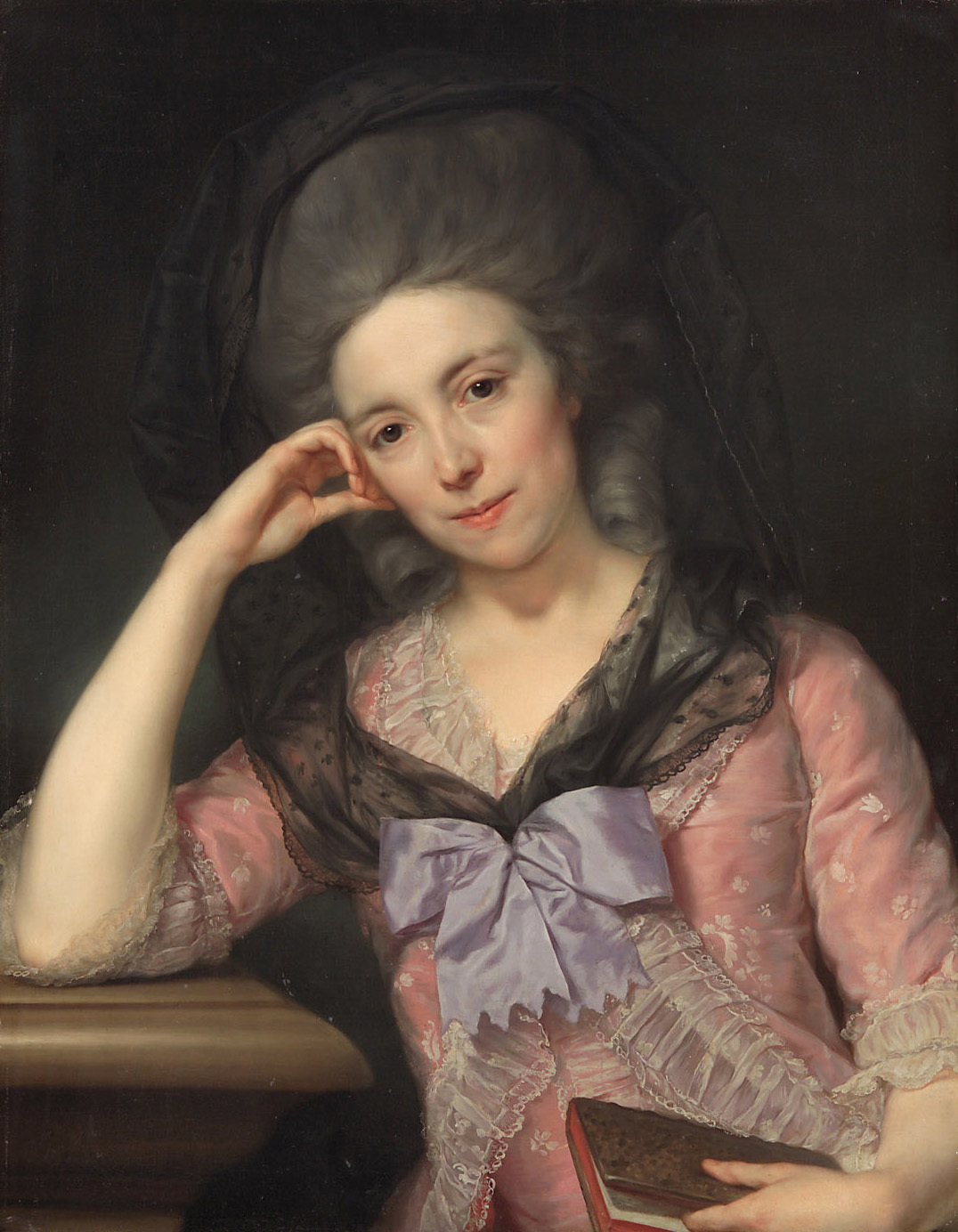
Elisabeth Hervey, Countess of Bristol

Events from the year 1778 in Austria

== Incumbents ==
- Monarch – Maria Theresa
- Monarch – Joseph II
- State Chancellor - Wenzel Anton

== Events ==
- (3 July 1778 - 13 May 1779) - the War of the Bavarian Succession was a dispute between the Austrian habsburg monarchy and an alliance of Saxony and Prussia.

== Births ==
- January 26 - Johann Georg Stauffer, luthier (d. 1853)
- January 31 - Franz Anton von Kolowrat-Liebsteinsky, statesman (d. 1861)
- March 23 - Paul Traugott Meissner, chemist (d. 1864)
- March 24 - Anton Edler von Gapp, lawyer (d. 1862)
- April 10 - Johann Arzberger, technologist (d. 1835)
- May 8 - Johann Baptist Gänsbacher, composer (d. 1844)
- July 10 - Sigismund von Neukomm, composer and pianist (d. 1858)
- August 2 - Georg Anton Rollett, naturalist (d. 1842)
- November 14 - Johann Nepomuk Hummel, composer, virtuoso pianist (d. 1837)
- November 16 - Johann Joseph von Prechtl, technologist (d. 1854)

== Deaths ==
- July 3 – Anna Maria Mozart, Austrian mother to the Mozarts (b. 1720)
