= 1988 in Austria =

- Decades: 1960s; 1970s; 1980s; 1990s; 2000s
- See also: Other events of 1988; List of years in Austria

Events in the year 1988 in Austria.

== Incumbents ==
- President: Kurt Waldheim
- Chancellor: Franz Vranitzky

== Events ==
- 17 January–24 January – The Winter Paralympics are held in Innsbruck.
- 25 June – The Far right National Democratic Party (Austria) was banned by a verdict of the Constitutional Court of Austria on the basis of the Verbotsgesetz 1947. In its explanatory statement the court determined that the NDP's "key principles and demands" are based on "biological-racist ideology ("Volksbegriff")" and also that its "pan-German Propaganda" is in agreement with the main goals of the Nazi Party.
- 19 October – The newspaper Der Standard is first published.
- 26 October – 20 year old Alexandra Schriefl is murdered in Favoriten, Vienna. Her murder remains unsolved until September 2000.
- 20 December – The United Nations Convention Against Illicit Traffic in Narcotic Drugs and Psychotropic Substances takes place in Vienna.
- The non-profit art foundation Generali Foundation is established.

== Births ==
- 2 January – Julian Baumgartlinger, footballer
- 5 February – Markus Ragger, chess player
- 17 February – Natascha Kampusch, author and kidnap survivor
- 13 March – Dominik Landertinger, biathlete
- 21 March – Michael Madl, footballer
- 13 September – Eva-Maria Brem, alpine skier
- 3 November – Veli Kavlak, footballer
- 6 November – Conchita Wurst, singer and Eurovision Song Contest 2014 winner
