= 1938 in Austria =

- Decades: 1910s; 1920s; 1930s; 1940s; 1950s
- See also: Other events of 1938; List of years in Austria

Events from the year 1938 in Austria

== Incumbents ==
- President: Wilhelm Miklas (until March 13)
- Chancellor: Kurt Schuschnigg (until March 11), Arthur Seyss-Inquart (March 11-March 13)

=== Governors ===
- Burgenland: Hans Sylvester (until 11 March)
- Carinthia: Arnold Sucher (until 11 March)
- Lower Austria: Josef Reither (until 12 March)
- Salzburg: Franz Rehrl (until 12 March); Rolph Trommer (3 March-12 March)
- Styria: Karl Maria Stepan (until 12 March)
- Tyrol: Josef Schumacher (until 12 March)
- Upper Austria: Heinrich Gleißner (until 11 March)
- Vienna: Richard Schmitz (until 11 March)
- Vorarlberg: Ernst Winsauer (until 12 March)

== Events ==
- February 12 – Chancellor Kurt von Schuschnigg meets Adolf Hitler at Berchtesgaden and is forced to yield to German demands for greater Nazi participation in the Austrian government.
- March 12 – Anschluss: On March 11–13, 1938, Nazi Germany annexed the neighboring country of Austria (Österreich). This event is known as the Anschluss. “Anschluss” is a German word that means “connection” or “joining.”German troops occupy Austria; annexation is declared the following day. German troops occupy Austria; annexation is declared the following day.
  - In a result, the Austrian electorate in a national referendum approved Anschluss by an 99.73%.
- July – The Mauthausen concentration camp is built.

== Births ==
- 9 October – Heinz Fischer, politician
- 13 October – Christiane Hörbiger, actress

== Deaths ==
- 17 May – Jakob Ehrlich, politician and Zionist
- 4 June – Otto Bauer, Social Democrat (born 1881; heart attack)
- 18 October – Karl Kautsky, philosopher and Marxist theorist (born 1854)
