= 1754 in Austria =

- Decades
- See also: Other events of 1754; List of years in Austria

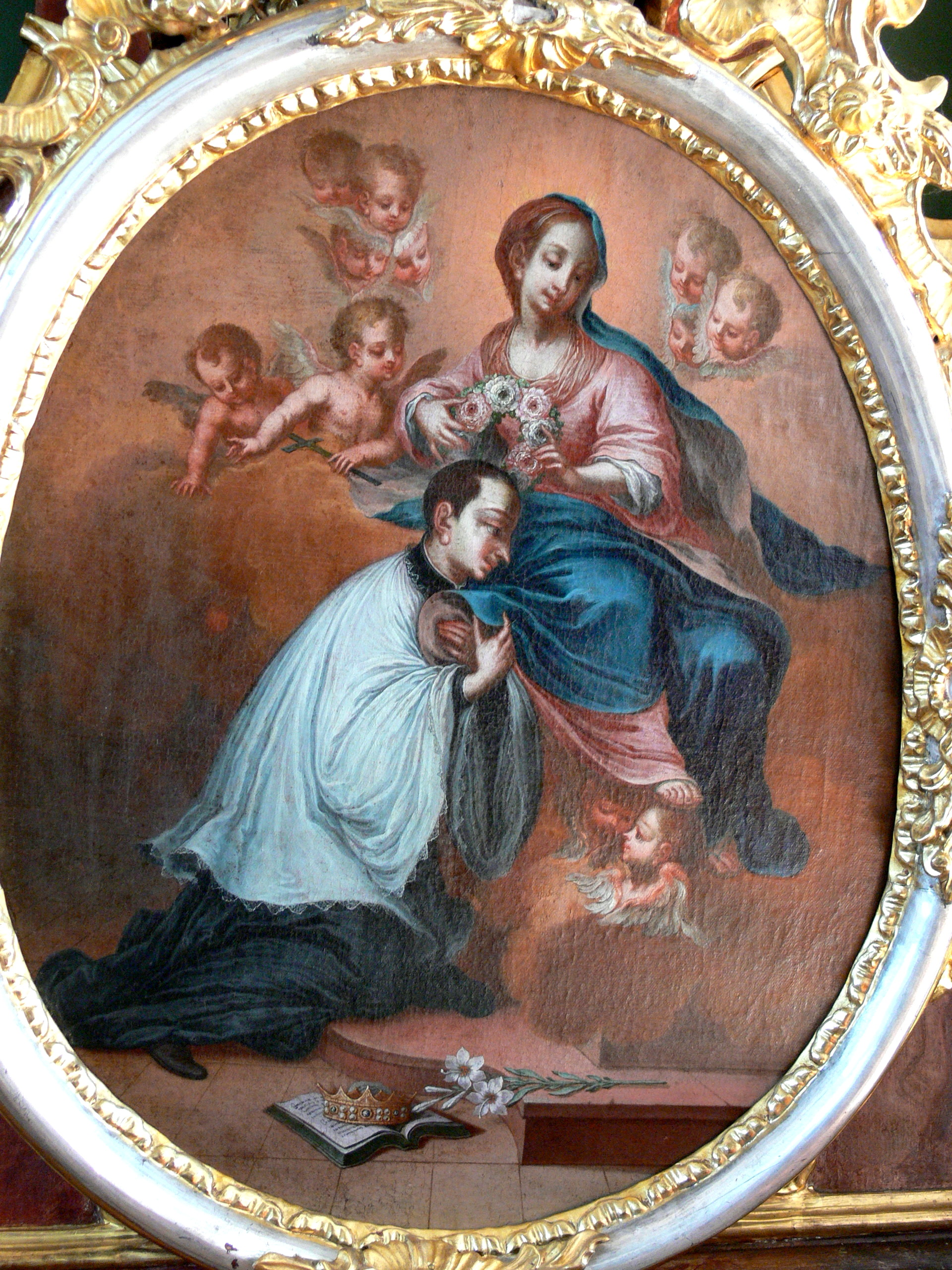
Sarleinsbach Pfarrkirche – Josefsaltar 6a

Events from the year 1754 in Austria

== Incumbents ==
- Monarch – Maria Theresa
- State Chancellor - Wenzel Anton

== Events ==
- - Bega canal
- - Gorizia and Gradisca
- - Madonna del Terremoto (Mantua)

== Births ==
- 1 June - Ferdinand Karl, Archduke of Austria-Este.
- 4 or 16 June - Franz Xaver von Zach.
- 12 May - Franz Anton Hoffmeister.

== Deaths ==
- 4 March - Léopold Philippe, 4th Duke of Arenberg.
- 27 April - Marie Karoline von Fuchs-Mollard, the governess of Maria Theresa of Austria.
- 21 June - Johann Baptist Martinelli
- 14 August - Maria Anna of Austria
