= 1785 in Austria =

- Decades: 1780s; 1790s; 1800s
- See also: Other events of 1785; List of years in Austria

Events from the year 1785 in Austria

== Incumbents ==
- Monarch – Joseph II
- State Chancellor – Wenzel Anton

== Events ==
- 29 July – Vienna experienced a flood that left much of the city submerged underwater
- Treaty of Fontainebleau; the Dutch agree to compensate the Austrian Netherlands for the continued closure of the Scheldt River to navigation.
- Joseph II extends serfdom reforms to Hungary, granting peasants greater personal freedoms.

== Births ==
- 6 January – Franz Gräffer, librarian and bookseller
- 6 February – Bernhard Caboga‑Cerva, general
- 2 November – Archduke Karl Ambrosius of Austria‑Este, Archbishop of Esztergom
- 13 December – Anna Milder‑Hauptmann, Vienna opera singer

== Deaths ==
- 19 March – Melchior Rasp, stonemason
- 26 December – Ignatz Anton von Weiser, playwright and dialect poet. (b. 1701)
