= Karl Karmarsch =

Austrian-born German educator

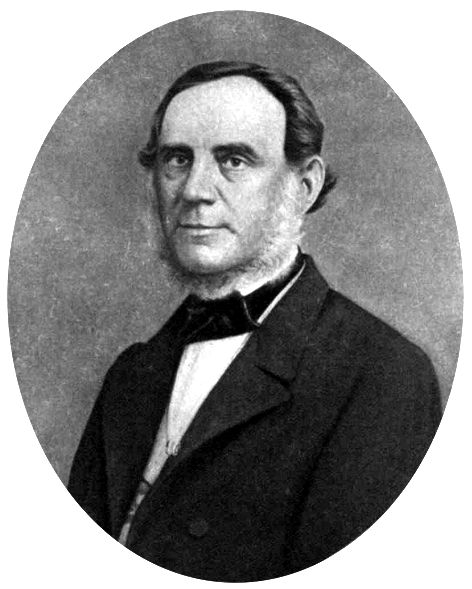
- Born: 17 October 1803; Vienna, Austria
- Died: 24 March 1879 (aged 75); Hanover, Prussia

Karl Karmarsch (17 October 1803 – 24 March 1879) was an Austrian-born (since 1830) German educator, founding director of the Polytechnic School in Hanover, later to become the Leibniz University Hannover.

From 1817 to 1823, he was associated with the Polytechnic Institute of Vienna, where he was a student of Georg Altmütter (1787–1858). From 1830 until his retirement in 1875, he served as director at Hanover, In 1863, he was elected a foreign member of the Royal Swedish Academy of Sciences.

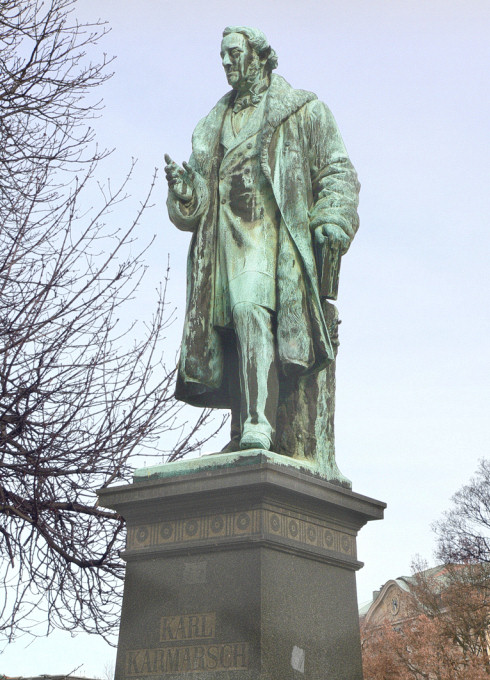
Bronze statue of Karmarsch in Hanover

Karmarsch was a promoter of higher technical education in Germany, and considered a pioneer of mechanical technology. With Johann Joseph von Prechtl (1778–1854), he was an editor of a multi-volume encyclopedia of technology called Technologische Encyklopädie oder alphabetisches Handbuch der Technologie, der technischen Chemie und des Maschinenwesens. Other principal works by Karmarsch include:

- Grundriß der mechanischen Technologie, two volumes 1837/41 - Outline of mechanical technology.
- Geschichte Der Technologie Seit Der Mitte Des Achtzehnten Jahrhundert, 1872 - History of technology since the mid-eighteenth century.
