= 1750 in Austria =

- Decades
- See also: Other events of 1750; List of years in Austria

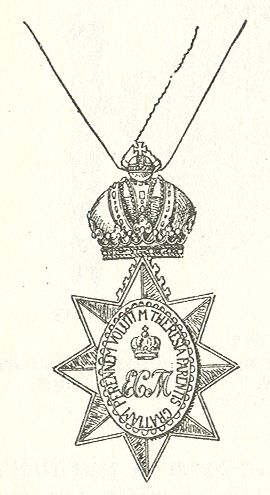
Elisabeth-Theresia-Orde Oostenrijk

Events from the year 1750 in Austria

== Incumbents ==
- Monarch – Maria Theresa

== Events ==
- Order of Elizabeth and Theresa
- September 20 - Great Fire of Hallstatt
- October 6 - Execution of Maria Pauer. She was the last women convicted and executed for witchcraft in present day Austria.

== Births ==
- 23 March - Johannes Matthias Sperger. He was born in Feldsberg, then part of Lower Austria (now Valtice, Czech Republic). Known for his symphonies and double bass concertos.

== Deaths ==
- March 5 - Franz Anton Khaltprunner - He was a Roman Catholic priest of Lend, St. Gilgen, Taxenbach, and Piesendorf.
- October 6 - Maria Pauer - was the last person known to be burned at the stake as a witch in Austria.
