= 1953 in Austria =

- Decades: 1930s; 1940s; 1950s; 1960s; 1970s
- See also: Other events of 1953; List of years in Austria

Events from the year 1953 in Austria.

== Incumbents ==
- President – Theodor Körner
- Chancellor – Leopold Figl (until 2 April 1953), Julius Raab (after 2 April 1953)

== Events ==
- 22 February – 1953 Austrian legislative election
- 3 July – 1953 German–Austrian Nanga Parbat expedition

== Births ==
- Gerald Kargl, Austrian film director
- 14 February – Hans Krankl, Austrian footballer
- 6 August – Martin Schlaff, Austrian businessman
- 15 September – Patricia Rhomberg, Austrian pornographic film actress
- 5 November – Lisl Wagner-Bacher, Austrian cook

== Deaths ==
- 12 February – Leo Freundlich, Austrian–Czech journalist and politician
