= 1961 in Austria =

- Decades: 1940s; 1950s; 1960s; 1970s; 1980s
- See also: Other events of 1961; List of years in Austria

The following article details events and facts of 1961 in Austria.

== Incumbents ==
- President of Austria: Adolf Schärf
- Chancellor of Austria: Julius Raab until April 11, Alfons Gorbach from April 11

=== Governors ===
- Burgenland: Johann Wagner (until 8 August), Josef Lentsch (starting 8 August)
- Carinthia: Ferdinand Wedenig
- Lower Austria: Johann Steinböck
- Salzburg: Josef Klaus (until 17 April), Hans Lechner (starting 17 April)
- Styria: Josef Krainer Sr.
- Tyrol: Hans Tschiggfrey
- Upper Austria: Heinrich Gleißner
- Vienna: Franz Jonas
- Vorarlberg: Ulrich Ilg

== Events ==
- April 18: The Vienna Convention on Diplomatic Relations is signed.
- June 3–4: The Vienna summit, a meeting between John F. Kennedy and Nikita Khrushchev, is held.

== Births ==
- June 21: Bernhard Ludvik, physician.
- 28 November: Klaus Köchl, politician.
