= 1766 in Austria =

- Decades: 1780s
- See also: Other events of 1766; List of years in Austria

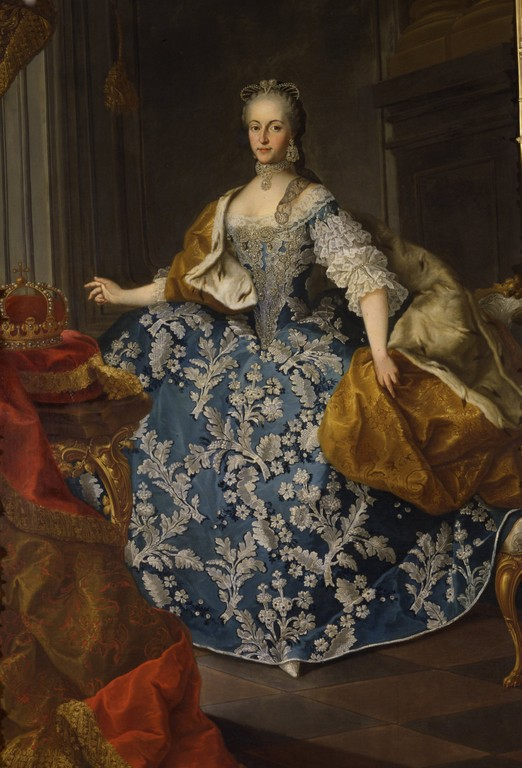
Maria Josepha of Bavaria, Holy Roman Empress by Martin van Meytens

Events from the year 1766 in Austria

== Incumbents ==
- Monarch – Maria Theresa
- Monarch – Joseph II
- State Chancellor - Wenzel Anton

== Births ==
- November 2 – Joseph Radetzky von Radetz, Austrian field marshal (d. 1858)
- Victor von Prendel, The Austro-Russian Major (d. 1852)

== Deaths ==
- February 5 – Count Leopold Joseph von Daun, Austrian field marshal (b. 1705)
