= 1791 in Austria =

- Decades: 1780s; 1790s; 1800s
- See also: Other events of 1791; List of years in Austria

Events from the year 1791 in Austria

== Incumbents ==
- Monarch – Leopold II
- State Chancellor - Wenzel Anton

== Events ==
- - Treaty of Sistova
- Declaration of Pillnitz

== Births ==
- Franz Grillparzer
- Carl Czerny, An Austrian pianist, teacher, and composer known for his pedagogical works for the piano.
- Franz Xaver, known as Wolfgang Amadeus Mozart, Jr and he was a composer, pianist, conductor and teacher.
- Marie louise of Austria she was Duchess of Parma and Napoleon's second wife.

== Deaths ==
- Wolfgang Amadeus Mozart
