= 1802 in Austria =

- Decades: 1780s; 1790s; 1800s
- See also: Other events of 1802; List of years in Austria

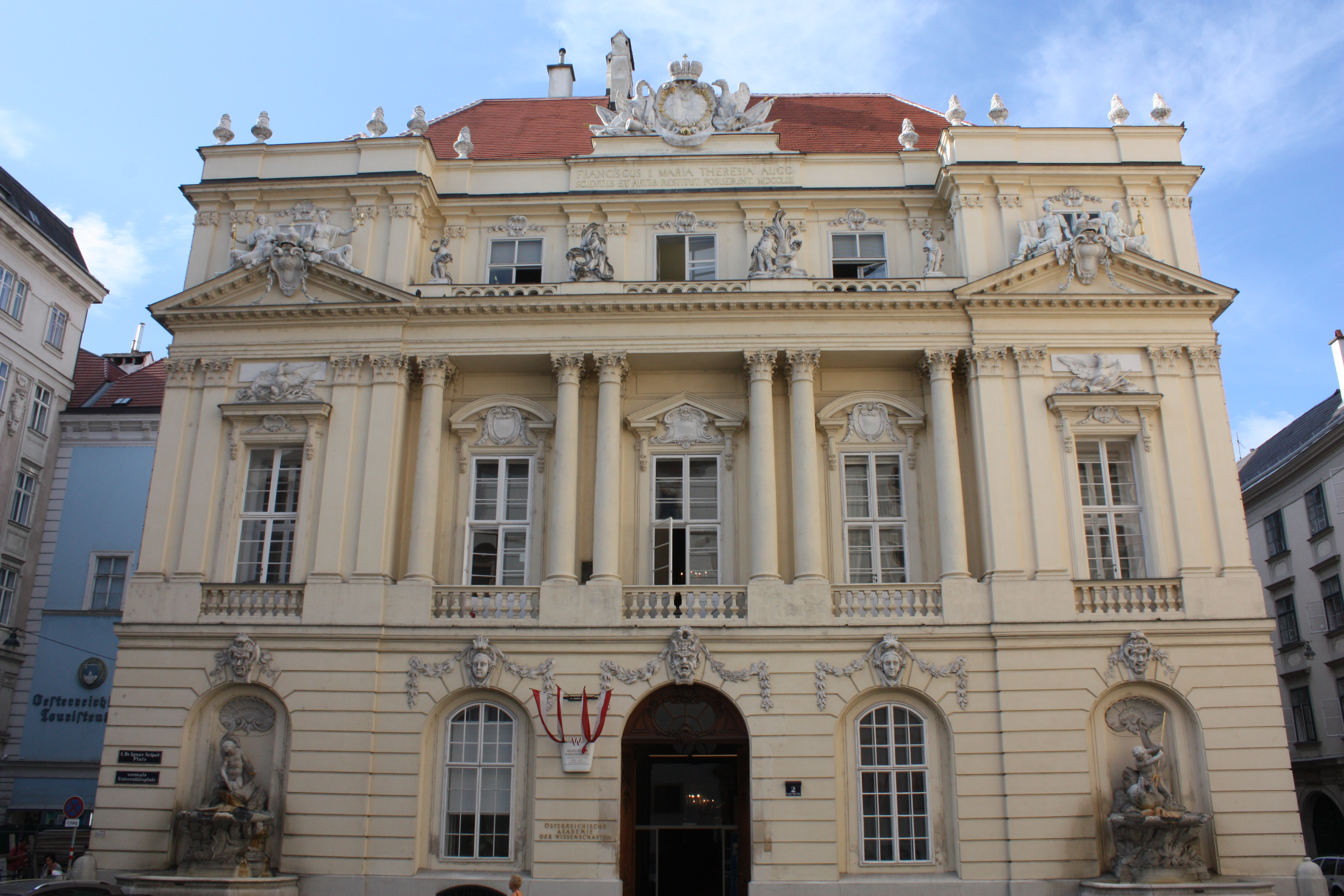
Assembly hall of the old University of Vienna: the first headquarter of the Gesellschaft der Ärzte – today it is the headquarter of the Academy of Sciences.

Events from the year 1802 in Austria

== Incumbents ==
- Monarch – Francis II
- State Chancellor - Ludwig von Cobenzl
- Palatine of Hungary - Archduke Joseph (Note: Though not explicitly part of Austria, Hungary was a territory of the Habsburg crown)
- Ban of Croatia - Ivan Erdődy (Note: Though not explicitly part of Austria, Croatia was a territory of the Habsburg crown)

== Events ==
- - Gesellschaft der Ärzte in Wien

Beethoven writes a letter in Heiligenstadt, near Vienna, about his deafness and inexorable decline, which should be only read out after his death.

War of the Second Coalition ended on the 25th March 1802, which resulted in a French victory and the survival of the French First Republic in accordance with the Treaty of Lunéville and Treaty of Amiens.

== Births ==
Archduke Franz Karl of Austria (Archduke of Austria, father of Franz Joseph I and Maximillian I of Mexico) was born on 17 December 1802.

Eduard von Bauernfeld (famous Austrian dramatist) was born in Vienna on 13 January 1802.

Leopold Fitzinger (famous Austrian zoologist) was born in Vienna on 13 April 1802.

== Deaths ==
- Johann Georg Joseph Spangler (an Austrian Composer) dies on 2 November 1802, (aged 50).
