= 2000 in Austria =

- Decades: 1980s; 1990s; 2000s; 2010s; 2020s
- See also: Other events of 2000; List of years in Austria

Events from the year 2000 in Austria.

== Incumbents ==
- President: Thomas Klestil
- Chancellor: Viktor Klima (until 4 February), Wolfgang Schüssel (starting 4 February)

=== Governors ===
- Burgenland: Hans Niessl
- Carinthia: Jörg Haider
- Lower Austria: Erwin Pröll
- Salzburg: Franz Schausberger
- Styria: Waltraud Klasnic
- Tyrol: Wendelin Weingartner
- Upper Austria: Josef Pühringer
- Vienna: Michael Häupl
- Vorarlberg: Herbert Sausgruber

== Events ==
- February 5 - Jörg Haider's far right Freedom Party of Austria enters into coalition government to international condemnation.
- October 3 - The Freedom Party becomes the second largest party following the parliamentary election.
- November 11 - Kaprun disaster: A cable car fire in an alpine tunnel kills 155 skiers and snowboarders.

== Deaths ==
- January 19 - Hedy Lamarr, actress (b. 1914)
- May 11 - Paula Wessely, actress (b. 1907)
- November 20 - Josef Schaupper, alpine skier who was killed in the Kaprun disaster (b. 1963)
- November 28 - Liane Haid, actress (b. 1895)
