= 1772 in Austria =

- Decades: 1780s; 1790s
- See also: Other events of 1772; List of years in Austria

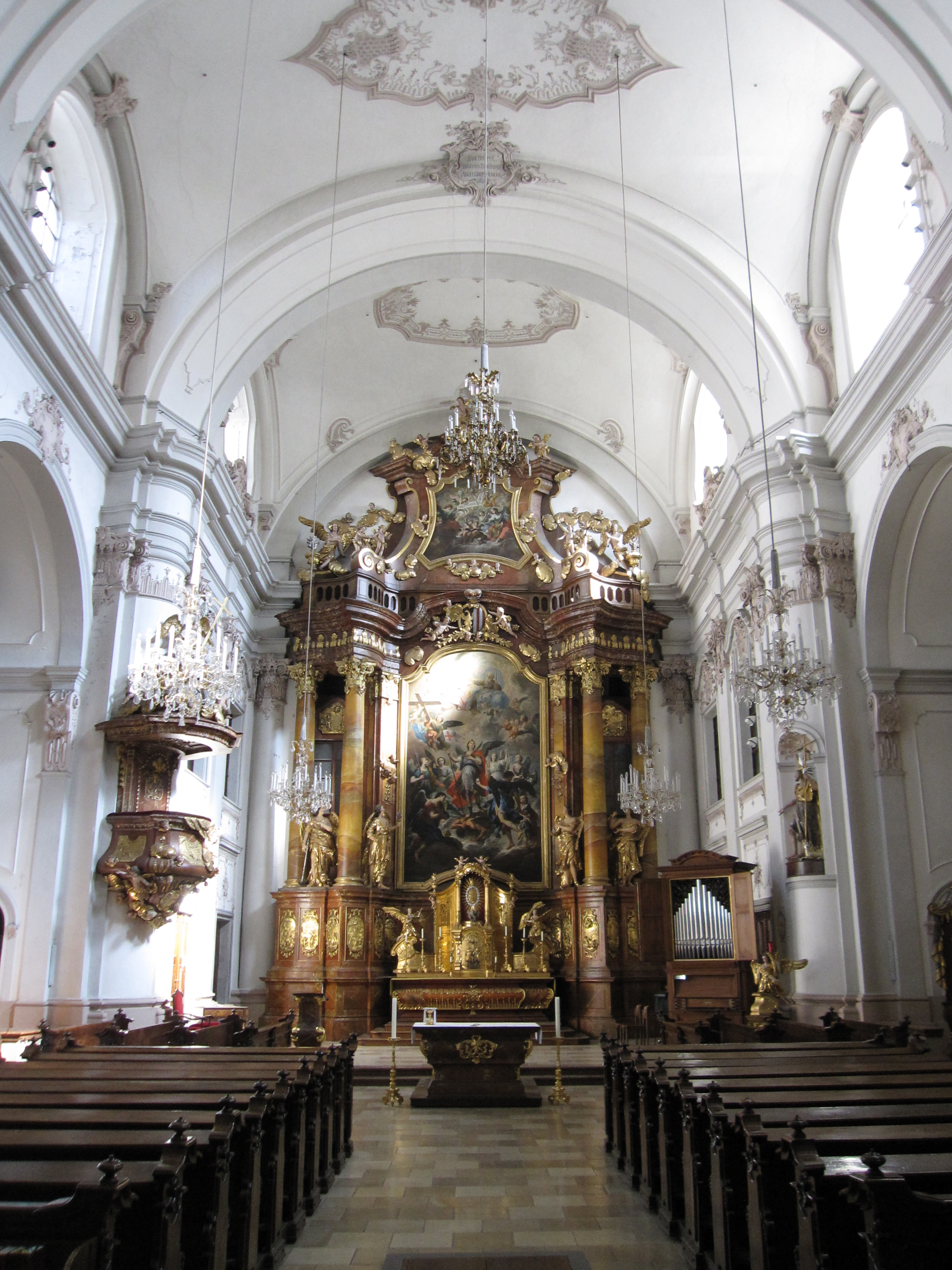
Linz 2011 14

Events from the year 1772 in Austria

== Incumbents ==
- Monarch – Maria Theresa
- Monarch – Joseph II
- State Chancellor - Wenzel Anton

== Events ==
- January 1 – Kingdom of Galicia and Lodomeria established.
- February 17 – The first partition of Poland is agreed to by the Russian Empire and Prussia, and later also by Austria.

== Births ==
- 1 April - Ignaz von Mosel, composer and court official (died 1844)

== Deaths ==
=== June ===
- June 18 – Gerard van Swieten, 72, Dutch-Austrian physician
