= 1788 in Austria =

- Decades: 1780s; 1790s; 1800s
- See also: Other events of 1788; List of years in Austria

Events from the year 1788 in Austria

== Incumbents ==
- Monarch – Joseph II
- State Chancellor – Wenzel Anton

== Events ==
- Austro-Turkish War begins
- Battle of Karansebes
- Theater in der Josefstadt

== Births ==
- Mathias Adler was an organist, sacristan and Principal of Pfarrschule Bischofshofen. (1788–1866)
- Johann Nepomuk Fleischl was a Monastery dean of the Kollegiatstift Seekirchen (1788–1864)
- Franz Xaver Gugg Jr was a Bell founder, technician, machine builder and a State Railway Inspector (1788–1856)
- Mathias Mauracher was an organ builder from the organ builder family "Mauracher" (1788–1857)
- Josef Thalmayr Sr was a Mayor of Saalfelden (1788–1859)
- Josef Tremml was a Cathedral organist and a Choir Regent for Stiftskirche St. Peter (1788–1857)
