= 1760 in Austria =

- Decades: 1780s
- See also: Other events of 1760; List of years in Austria

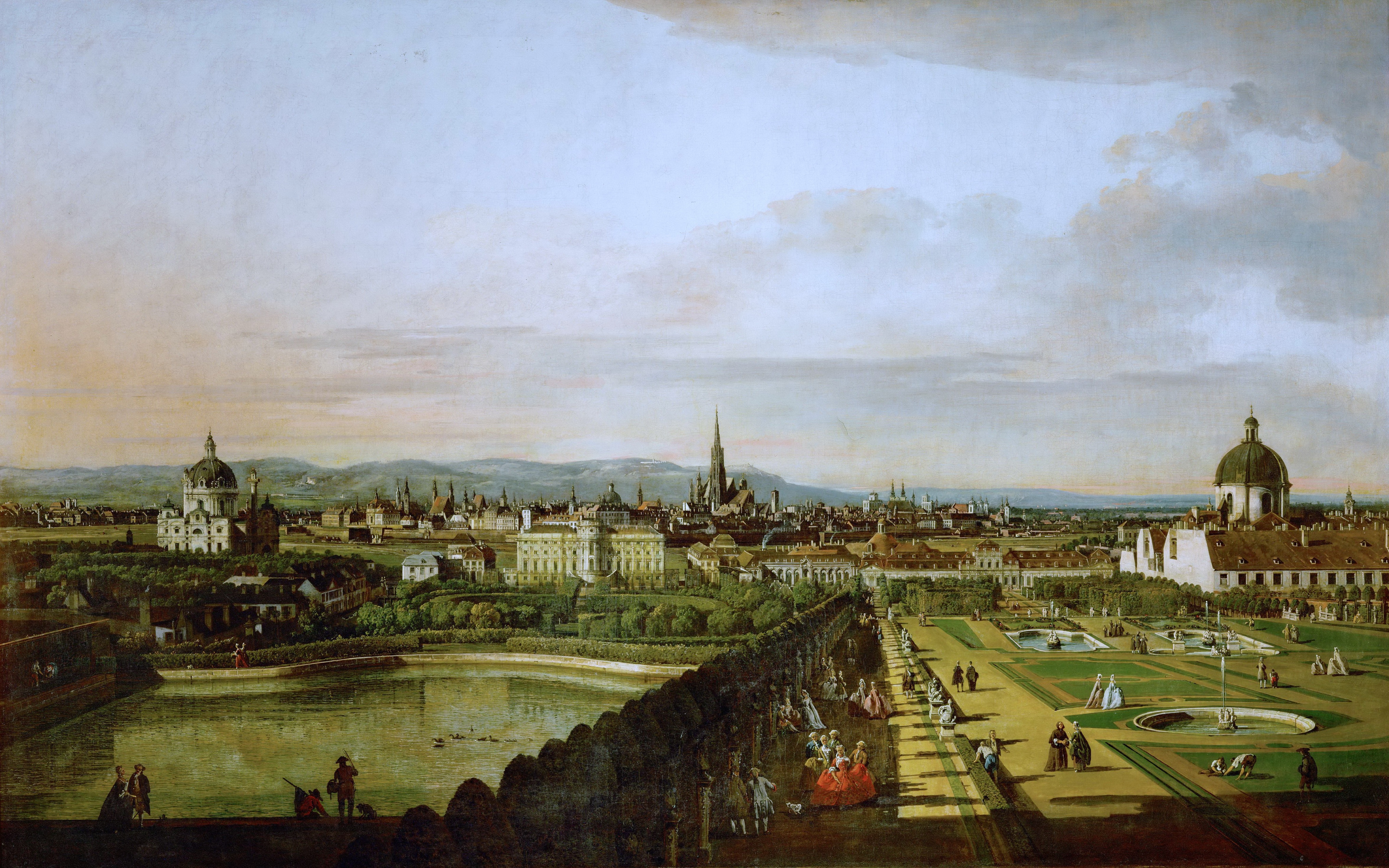
Bernardo Bellotto, il Canaletto - View of Vienna from the Belvedere - WGA01841

Events from the year 1760 in Austria

== Incumbents ==
- Monarch – Maria Theresa

== Events ==
- August 30 – Seven Years' War – Battle of Legnica: Prussia under Frederick the Great defeat the Austrian army of Marshal Laudon before it can unite with that of Marshal Daun.
- November 3 – Seven Years' War – Battle of Torgau: The Prussian army defeats Daun's Austrians, who withdraw across the Elbe.
- September 5 - The Marriage of Josef II and Isabella of Parma

== Births ==
- April 20 - Georg Sigmund Robining von Rottenfeld was the owner of an ironworks business and a captain in the Imperial and Royal Landwehr.
- June 26 - Johann I Joseph Prince of Liechtenstein (d. 1836)
- July 29 - Johann Georg Laschensky was a mason and master builder from Salzburg
- December 21 - Carl Ehrenbert Freiherr von Moll was a jurist and statesman from Salzburg

== Deaths ==
- February 17 - Franz Anton Danreiter was a renowned architect, court gardener, and draftsman.
