= Georg Altmütter =

Austrian technologist

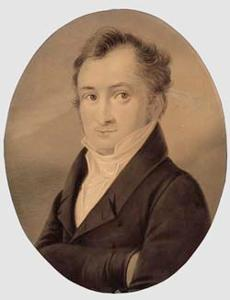
Georg Altmütter (1787–1858)

Georg Altmütter (6 October 1787, Vienna – 2 January 1858) was an Austrian technologist.

He was a student at the Universities of Vienna and Prague, afterwards serving as an assistant of physics at the Theresianum in Vienna. From 1816 until his death he was a professor of mechanical technology at the Polytechnic Institute in Vienna.

Altmütter is remembered for his technical innovations and inventions, such as improvements for the fabrication of playing cards, a casting process for pinheads, production of terrestrial and celestial globes, and development of new tools, to name a few. His extensive tool collection is now housed at the Technical Museum in Vienna.

Since 1892, the Altmüttergasse in the Alsergrund district of Vienna has been named in his honor. Altmütter was a good friend of playwright Franz Grillparzer (1791–1872).

== Writings ==
His earlier scientific papers (from 1819) were published in the Annals of the Imperial and Royal Polytechnic Institute, and from 1830, his articles were included in Johann Joseph von Prechtl's Technologische Encyklopädie. Among his principal works is the following:

- Beschreibung der Werkzeug-Sammlung des k.k. polytechnischen Institutes: nebst einem vollständigen Verzeichnisse der in derselben enthaltenen Stücke : für Gewerbsleute und Liebhaber der mechanischen Künste; vorzüglich aber zum Gebrauche seiner Vorlesungen, 1825 - Description of the tool collection of the Imperial Polytechnic Institute, etc.
