= 1775 in Austria =

- Decades: 1780s; 1790s
- See also: Other events of 1775; List of years in Austria

Events from the year 1775 in Austria

== Incumbents ==
- Monarch – Maria Theresa
- Monarch – Joseph II
- State Chancellor - Wenzel Anton

== Events ==
- January – The Habsburg monarchy forces the Ottoman Empire to cede Bukovina.

== Births ==
- March 30 – Hieronymus Karl Graf von Colloredo-Mansfeld, Austrian corps commander during the Napoleonic Wars (d. 1822)
- April 5 – Johann Nepomuk Rust, Austrian surgeon (d. 1840)
  - Adam Albert von Neipperg, Austrian general and statesman (d. 1829)
- June 12 - Johann Baptist Malfatti von Monteregio, Italian-Austrian physician (d. 1859)

== Deaths ==
- November 16 - Marian Paradeiser was an Austrian composer. (b. 1747)
