= 1908 in Austria =

- Decades: 1880s; 1890s; 1900s; 1910s; 1920s
- See also: Other events of 1908; List of years in Austria

The following lists events that happened during 1908 in Austria.

== Incumbents ==
- Emperor: Franz Joseph I of Austria
- Minister-President of Austria: Max Wladimir von Beck until November 15, Count Richard von Bienerth-Schmerling from November 15

== Events ==
- The Venus of Willendorf was discovered.

== Births ==
December 31 -Simon Wiesenthal, Nazi hunter (d. 2005)

== See also ==
- Austria in 1908 Olympics
