= 1805 in Austria =

- Decades: 1780s; 1790s; 1800s
- See also: Other events of 1805; List of years in Austria

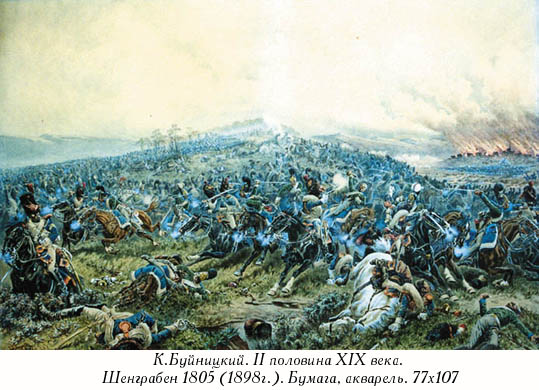
Battle of Schöngrabern by K.Bujnitsky

Events from the year 1805 in Austria

== Incumbents ==
- Monarch – Francis II
- State Chancellor - Ludwig von Cobenzl until December 25, Philipp Stadion from December 25

== Events ==
- 5 November – Battle of Amstetten
- 8 November – Battle of Mariazell
- 11 November – Battle of Dürenstein
- 13 November – Capitulation of Dornbirn
- 16 November - Battle of Schöngrabern
- 2 December - Battle of Austerlitz. A decisive victory for the French army over Austria and Russia.

== Births ==
- 27 January – Sophie Friederike Dorothea, archduchess (d. 1872)
- 23 August – Anton Ritter von Schmerling, statesman (d. 1893)
- 23 October – Adalbert Stifter, writer (d. 1868)
