= 1751 in Austria =

- Decades
- See also: Other events of 1751; List of years in Austria

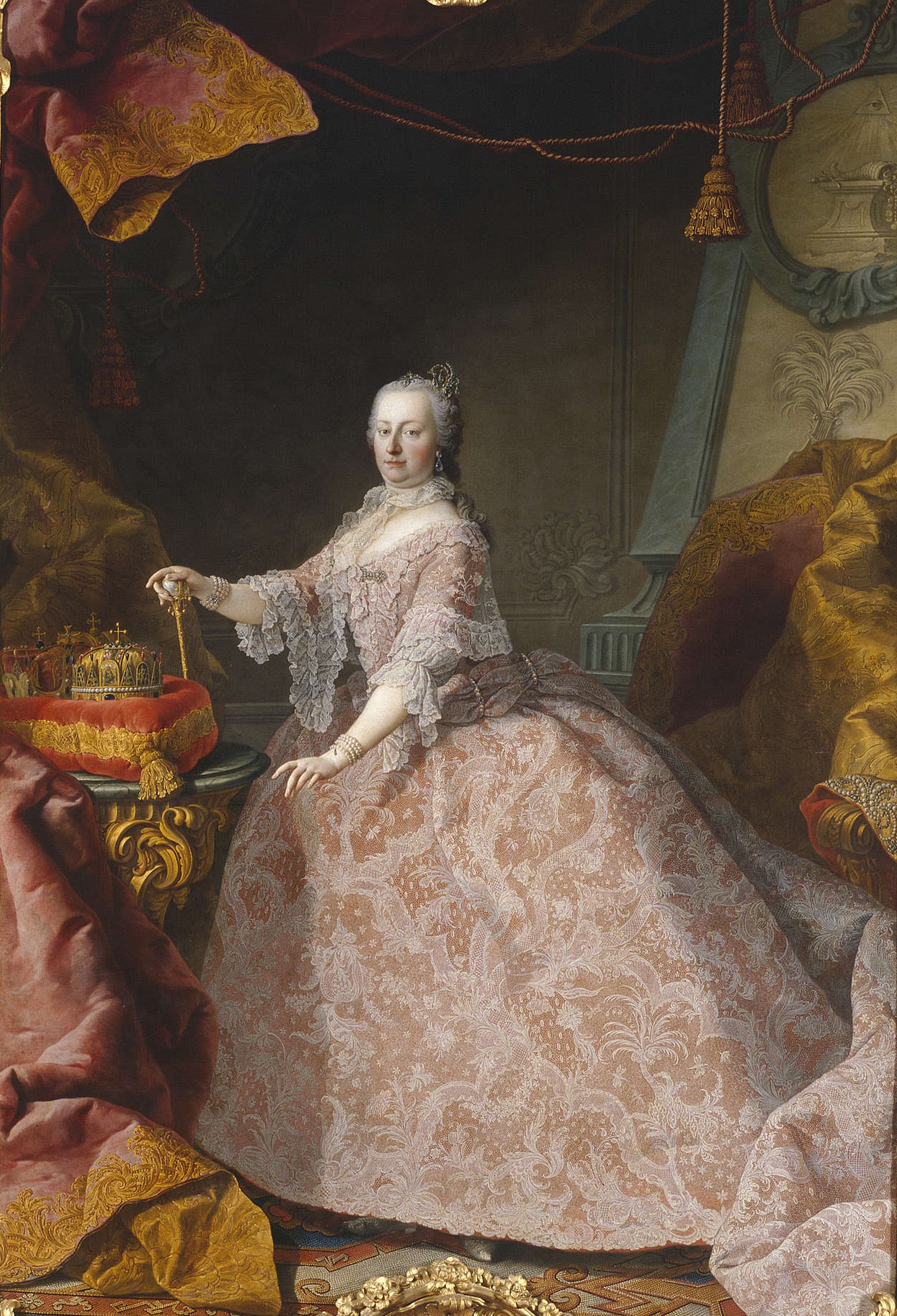
Maria Theresia of Austria 001

Events from the year 1751 in Austria

== Incumbents ==
- Monarch – Maria Theresa
- State Chancellor - Anton Corfiz Ulfeldt

== Events ==
- - Banat Military Frontier
- - District of Potisje
- December 14 – The Theresian Military Academy is founded in Wiener Neustadt, Austria.

== Births ==
- January 18 - Ferdinand Kauer, Austrian composer and pianist.
- February 22 - Heinrich XV, Prince Reuss of Greiz
- March 19 - Archduchess Maria Josepha of Austria, Austrian archduchess
- July 30 (midnight) – Maria Anna Mozart ("Nannerl"), Austrian pianist, singer, composer and violinist, sister of Wolfgang Amadeus Mozart
- October 24 - Georg Scholl, gardener at Schönbrunn Palace in Vienna.
- December 26 - Clement Mary Hofbauer, Austrian Redemptorist and saint
