= 1769 in Austria =

- Decades: 1780s
- See also: Other events of 1769; List of years in Austria

Events from the year 1769 in Austria

== Incumbents ==
- Monarch – Maria Theresa
- Monarch – Joseph II
- State Chancellor - Wenzel Anton

== Events ==
- The education under the Imperial Austria reformed the curriculum and somewhat decentralized the administration of the whole system.
- 1769 Austrian annexation of Spis
- Count Lymar presented to Frederick the Great the plan of a partition of Poland.
- In February 1769, Austria occupied the county of Zips.
- In August 1769, a meeting was held between Joseph II and Frederick the Great at Neisse.
- In November 1769, fearing Russian gains in the Russo-Turkish War (1766-1774), Austria sends two infantry and two cavalry regiments to Transylvania to deter further Russian aggression.
- Austria received back Dalmatia in accordance with the Treaty of Campo-Formio.

== Deaths ==
- December 30 – Nicholas Taaffe, 6th Viscount Taaffe, Austrian soldier (b. 1685)
