= 1700 in Austria =

- Decades
- See also: Other events of 1700; List of years in Austria

Schönbrunn Palace

Events from the year 1700 in Austria

== Incumbents ==
- Monarch – Leopold I
- Hofkriegsrat – Ernst Rüdiger von Starhemberg
- Prince-Archbishop of Salzburg – Johann Ernst von Thun und Hohenstein

== Events ==
- Spring – Schönbrunn Palace became habitable.
- March 31 – Opening of Salzburg's first coffeehouse. The Cafegewölb Fontaine opened in Salzburg, today it is known as Café Tomaselli one of Austria's most historic coffeehouses.
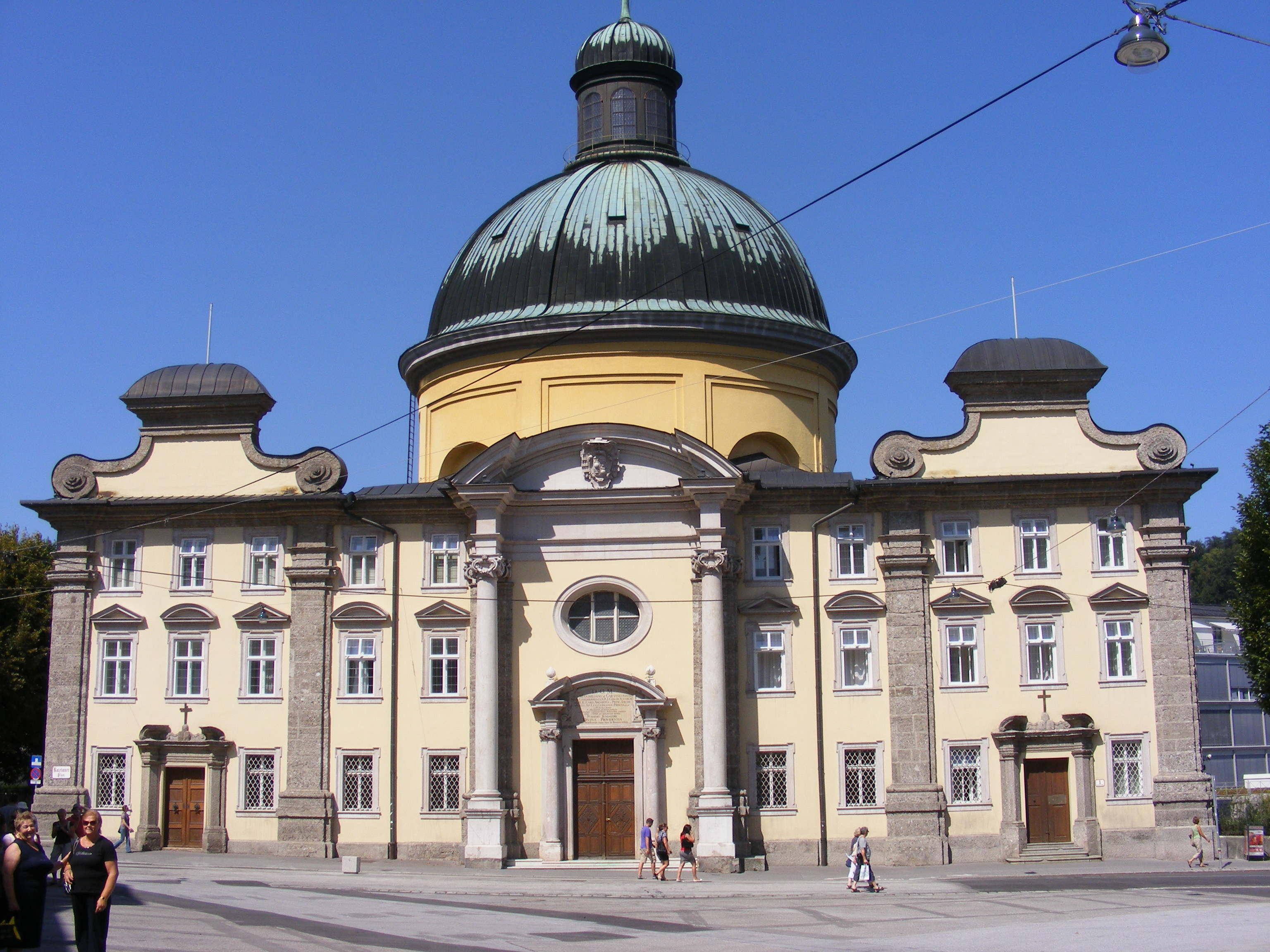
- St. Cajetan's Church
  October 31 – Consecration of the Kajetanerkirche. The Boroque St. Cajetan's Church (German: Kajetanerkirche) was consecrated in Salzburg by Archbishop Johann Ernst von Thun.

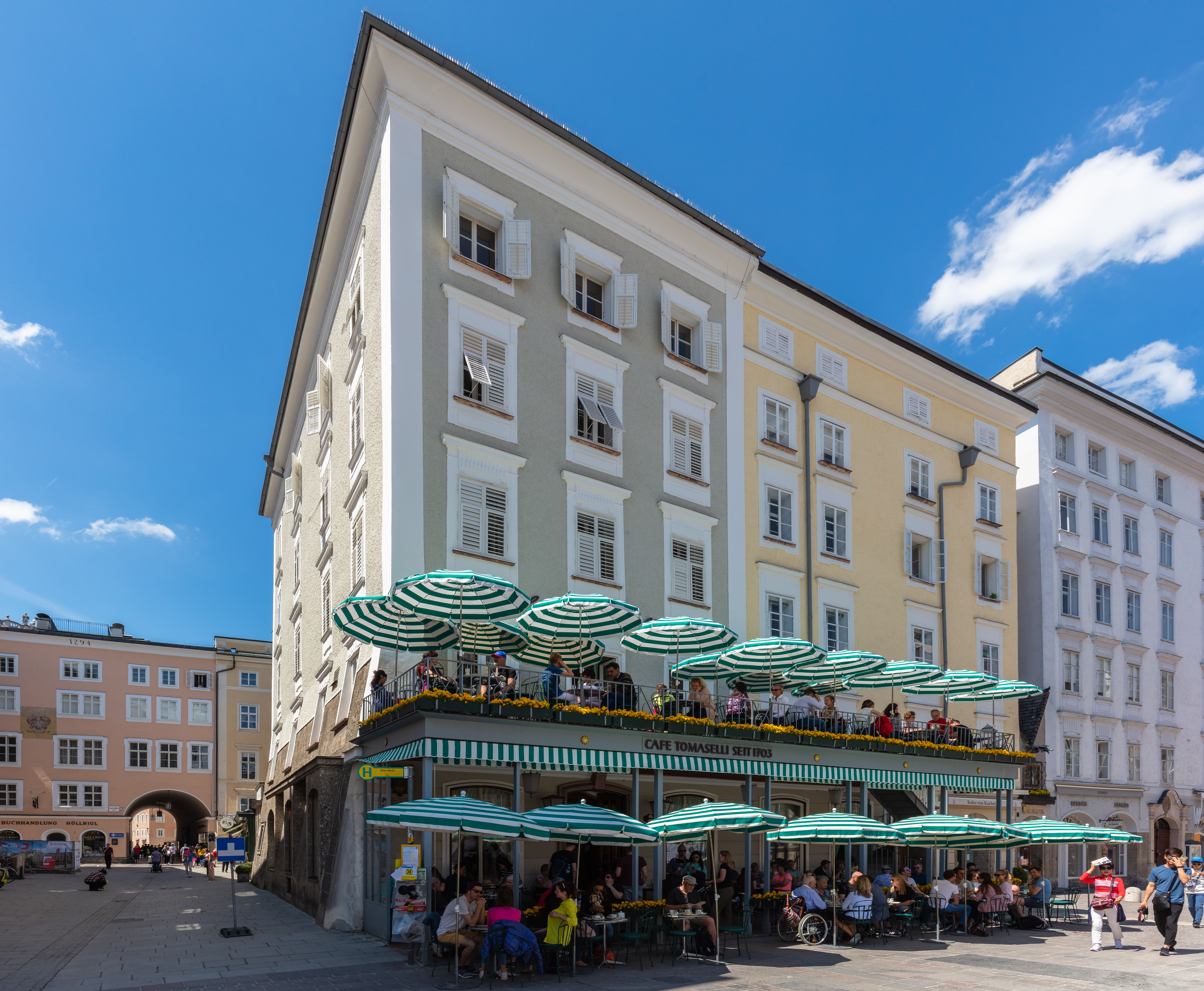
Café Tomaselli

== Births ==
- June – Ivan Ranger was a Tyrolese baroque painter.
- August 17 – Johann Michael Beer von Bleichten was a master builder and architect.
- July 29 – Peter Joseph Kofler was the mayor of Vienna.
- October 2 – Erasmus Fröhlich was an Austrian Jesuit mathematics teacher and numismatist.
- October 29 – Archduke of Austria Leopold Joseph died during |infancy.

== Deaths ==
- January 3 – Eva Magdalena von Windhag was a nun and the first prioress of the Dominican Convent of Windhaag in Upper Austria.
- January 16 – Antonio Draghi was a Baroque composer who died in Vienna.
- August 6 – Johann Beer was an Austrian author, court official, and composer.
