= 1781 in Austria =

- Millennia: 1st; 2nd; 3rd
- Centuries: 18th; 19th; 20th
- Decades: 1780s; 1790s; 1800s
- See also: Other events of 1781; List of years in Austria

Events from the year 1781 in Austria

== Incumbents ==
- Monarch – Joseph II
- State Chancellor - Wenzel Anton

== Events ==
- - Patent of Toleration
- - Austro-Russian alliance (1781)
- - Serfdom Patent (1781)
- - Theater in der Leopoldstadt

== Births ==
- - Anton Diabelli
