= 1763 in Austria =

- Decades: 1780s
- See also: Other events of 1763; List of years in Austria

Events from the year 1763 in Austria

== Incumbents ==
- Monarch – Maria Theresa

== Events ==
- February 15 – The Seven Years' War between Austria and Prussia and their allies is ended by the Treaty of Hubertusburg.
- June 9 - The Mozart family grand tour departed following the Seven Years' War. Leopold Mozart took seven year old Wolfgang Amadeus Mozart and his sister Maria Anna Mozart on a Western Europe tour to perform in front of royalty.
- July, August - Established Council of State reforms. Maria Theresa centralized the government to reduce the war debt.

== Births ==
- December 22 - Archduchess Christine of Austria (d. 1763)

== Deaths ==
- December 22 - Archduchess Christine of Austria (b. 1763)
- December 27 - Princess Isabella of Parma (b.1741)
