= 1797 in Austria =

- Decades: 1780s; 1790s; 1800s
- See also: Other events of 1797; List of years in Austria

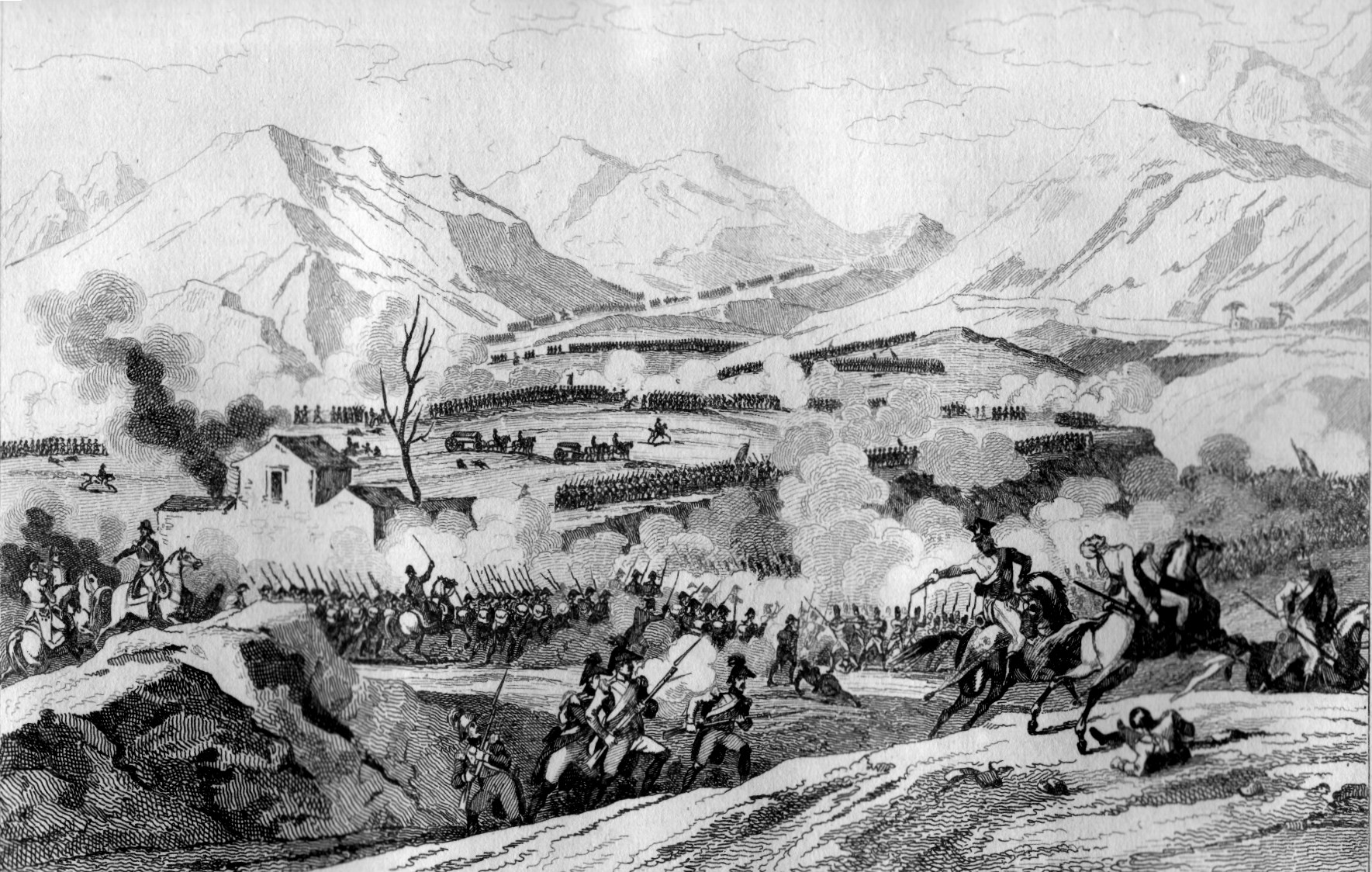
Battle of Rivoli, showing the French driving Prince Reuss' troops into the Pontare

Events from the year 1797 in Austria

== Incumbents ==
- Monarch – Francis II
- State Chancellor - Baron von Thugut

== Events ==
- Denisko Uprising
- Battle of Diersheim (1797)
- Battle of Neuwied (1797)

The Battle of Neuwied (18 April 1797) was a French victory in which Lazare Hoche's forces broke through Austrian lines, but the fighting proved pointless as an armistice was signed the same day, halting the war.

- Battle of Rivoli

The Battle of Rivoli (14 January 1797) was a decisive clash of the War of the First Coalition near Rivoli, then part of the Republic of Venice. During the final phase of the Italian campaign of 1796–1797, the outnumbered French Army of Italy under Napoleon Bonaparte defeated the Austrian forces led by József Alvinczi, who was attempting to relieve the siege of Mantua. The victory confirmed Bonaparte's military skill and led to the Austrian surrender of Mantua, French control of northern Italy, and France's defeat of Austria later in 1797.

- Treaty of Campo Formio 17 October 1797. The treaty's public articles concerned only France and Austria and called for a Congress of Rastatt to be held to negotiate a final peace for the Holy Roman Empire. In the treaty's secret articles, Austria as the personal state of the Emperor promised to work with France to certain ends at the congress. Among other provisions, the treaty meant the definitive end to the ancient Republic of Venice, which was disbanded and partitioned by the French and the Austrians.

== Births ==
- Franz Schubert

== Deaths ==
- Joseph Canto d'Irles, 10 April 1797

Joseph Franz Canto d’Irles was an Austrian general who fought against Napoleon Bonaparte during the Siege of Mantua (1796–1797). A career officer from a young age, he rose to the rank of Feldmarschall-Leutnant and commanded the fortress of Mantua, earning the Military Order of Maria Theresa for its defense. He died shortly after Mantua surrendered in 1797.

- Dagobert Sigmund von Wurmser, 22 August 1797

Dagobert Sigmund, Count von Wurmser was an Austrian field marshal of the French Revolutionary Wars, best known for his unsuccessful campaigns against Napoleon Bonaparte in Italy in 1796.
