= 1782 in Austria =

- Decades: 1780s; 1790s; 1800s
- See also: Other events of 1782; List of years in Austria

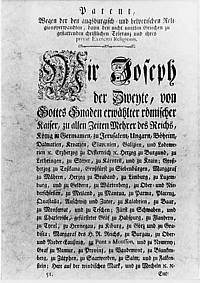
The Edict of Tolerance of 1782

Events from the year 1782 in Austria

== Incumbents ==
- Monarch – Joseph II
- State Chancellor - Wenzel Anton

== Events ==
- 16 July - Premiere of Wolfgang Amadeus Mozart's Die Entführung aus dem Serail at the Burgtheater, Vienna
- 1782 Edict of Tolerance

== Births ==
- 7 March – Franz Sartori, Austrian writer (d. 1832)
- 13 October – Joseph Nigg, Austrian painter and porcelain artist (d. 1863)

== Deaths ==
- 25 August – Marianna Auenbrugger, Austrian pianist and composer (b. 1759)
- 20 July – Karl Joseph von Firmian, Austrian nobleman and Plenipotentiary of Lombardy (b. 1716)
