= 1794 in Austria =

- Decades: 1780s; 1790s; 1800s
- See also: Other events of 1794; List of years in Austria

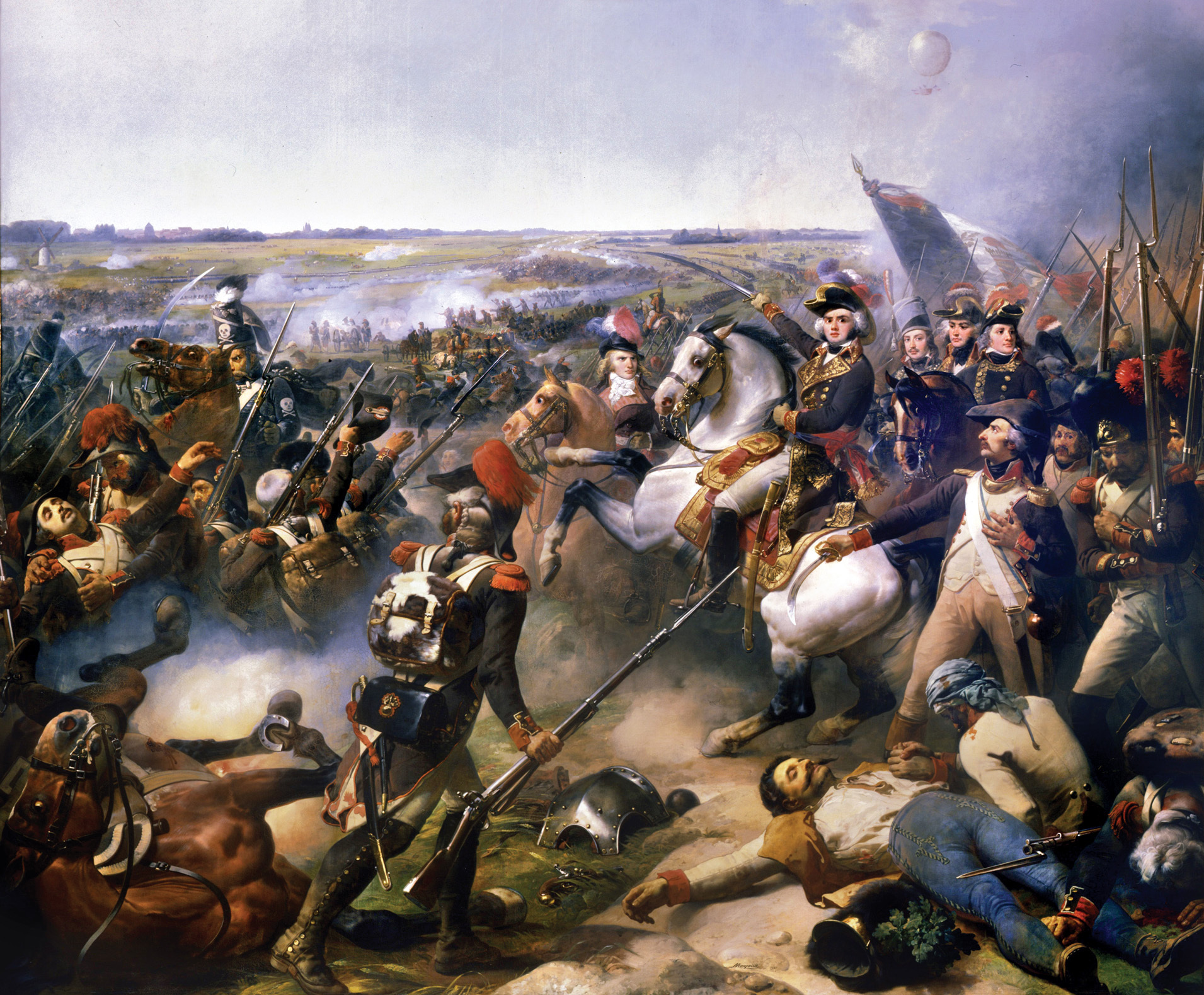
26 June: Battle of Fleurus

Events from the year 1794 in Austria

== Incumbents ==
- Monarch – Francis II
- State Chancellor - Baron von Thugut

== Events ==
- June 17 - June 26 – Battle of Fleurus: The Austrians and their allies are defeated by France, leading to the loss of the Austrian Netherlands.
- October 2 – Battle of Aldenhoven: The Austrians retreat from the Roer River, conceding control of the west bank of the Rhine River to France.

== Births ==
- Anselm Hüttenbrenner, (October 13, 1794) was an Austrian composer and pianist.
- Ferdinand Schubert (born October 18,1794) was an Austrian composer and brother of Franz Schubert.

== Deaths ==
- June 27 - Wenzel Anton, Prince of Kaunitz-Rietberg, Austrian statesman (b. 1711)
