= 1800 in Austria =

- Decades: 1780s; 1790s; 1800s
- See also: Other events of 1800; List of years in Austria

The following events occurred in Austria in the year 1800.

== Incumbents ==
- Monarch – Francis II
- State Chancellor - Johann Amadeus, Baron von Thugut
- Palatine of Hungary - Archduke Joseph (Note: Though not explicitly part of Austria, Hungary was a territory of the Habsburg crown)
- Ban of Croatia - Ivan Erdődy (Note: Though not explicitly part of Austria, Croatia was a territory of the Habsburg crown)

== Events ==
- - War of the Second Coalition (1798-1802)
  - - Battle of Ampfing (1800)
  - - Battle of Biberach (1800)
  - - Battles of Stockach and Engen
  - - Battle of Erbach
- Premiere of Ludwig van Beethoven’s Symphony No.1

== Births ==
- 14 January – Ludwig Ritter von Köchel, Composer (died 1877)
- Johann Till the elder, painter (died 1899)
