= 1757 in Austria =

- Decades
- See also: Other events of 1757; List of years in Austria

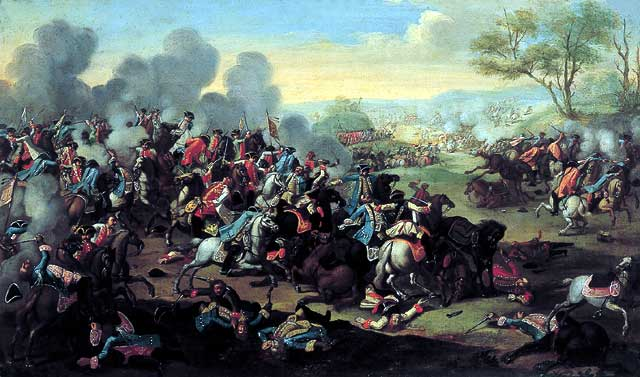
Battle of Kolín

Events from the year 1757 in Austria

== Incumbents ==
- Monarch – Maria Theresa
- State Chancellor - Wenzel Anton

== Events ==
- May 6 – Seven Years' War – Battle of Prague: The Prussians under Frederick the Great defeats an Austrian army and begins to besiege the city of Prague.
- June 18 – Seven Years' War – Battle of Kolín: Prussia is defeated by an Austrian army under Marshal Daun, forcing the Prussian army to evacuate Bohemia.
- November 22 – Seven Years' War – Battle of Breslau: The Austrian army under Prince Charles Alexander of Lorraine defeats the Prussian army of Wilhelm of Brunswick-Bevern and the Prussians retires behind the Oder.
- December 6
  - Seven Years' War – Battle of Leuthen: Frederick defeats Prince Charles's Austrian army.
- December 7–December 20
  - Seven Years' War – Siege of Breslau: Frederick retakes the city of Breslau.

== Births ==
- March 4 - Adam Ignaz Franz de Paula Joseph - was a composer and oboist.
- June 18 - Ignaz Josef Pleyel was a composer, music publisher and piano builder.
- October 26 - Karl Leonhard Reinhold was a philosopher born in Austria.
- October 31 - Ignaz Spangler was a singer and composer, born in Vienna, Austria.
