= Lisl Wagner-Bacher =

Austrian cook (born 1953)

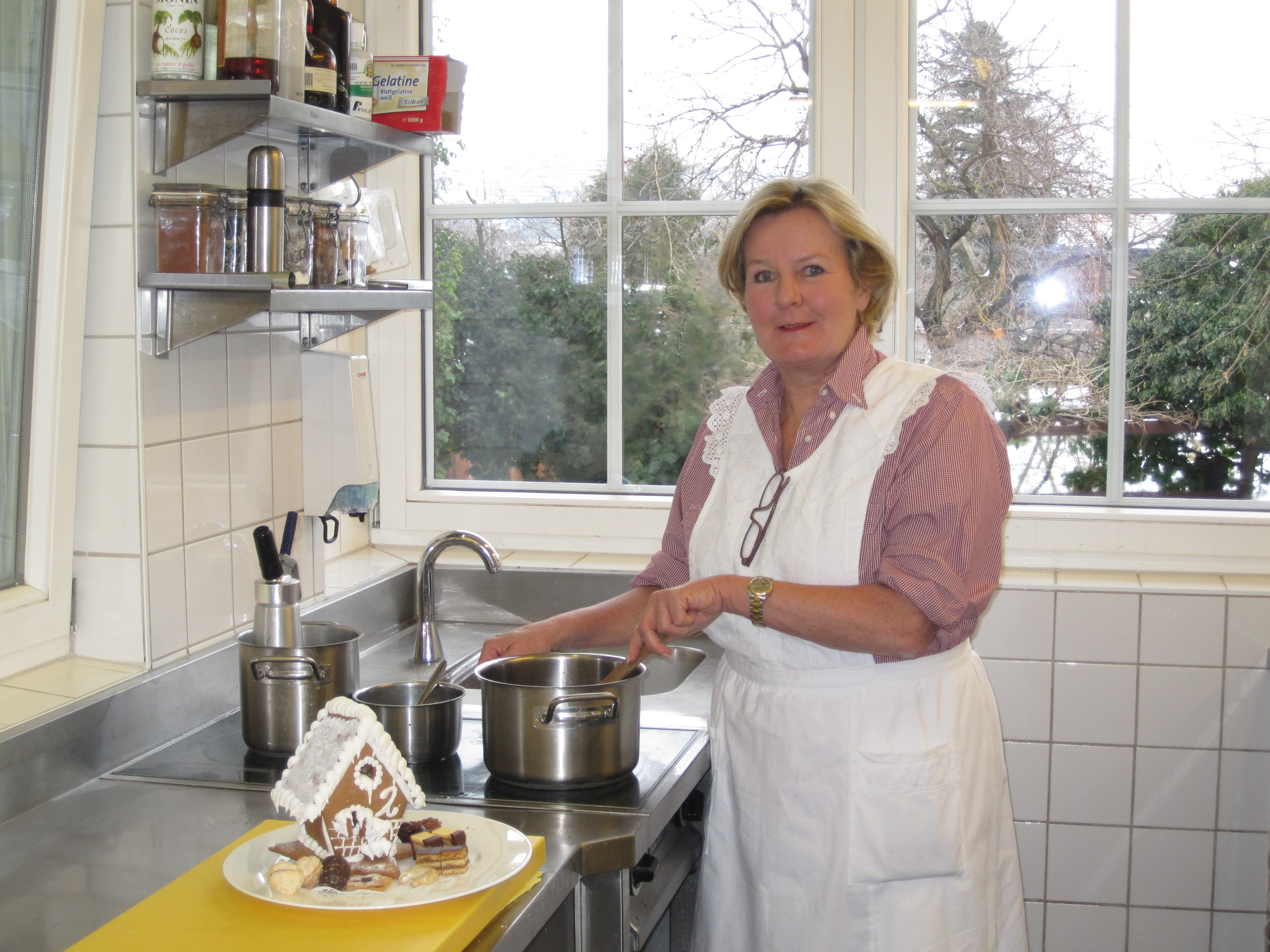
- Lisl Wagner-Bacher in 2009
- Born: Elisabeth Wagner-Bacher; 5 November 1953 (age 72); Mautern an der Donau, Austria
- Known for: Cooking

Elisabeth "Lisl" Wagner-Bacher (born 5 November 1953) is an Austrian cook. She was the co-owner of the family restaurant Landhaus Bacher.

== Biography ==
Wagner-Bacher attended high school in Krems and graduated from hotel management school in Bad Reichenhall. She then worked in her parents' business, initially in service and, from 1977, in the kitchen.

In 1979, Wagner-Bacher took over her parents' inn and ran it together with her husband Klaus Wagner (1948–2025) under the name Landhaus Bacher. She gained inspiration for her cooking in seminars given by Werner Matt and Reinhard Gerer at the Hilton Hotel in Vienna.

In 1982 she was awarded the first toque by Gault Millau.

In 2010, her son-in-law Thomas Dorfer became head chef at Landhaus Bacher.

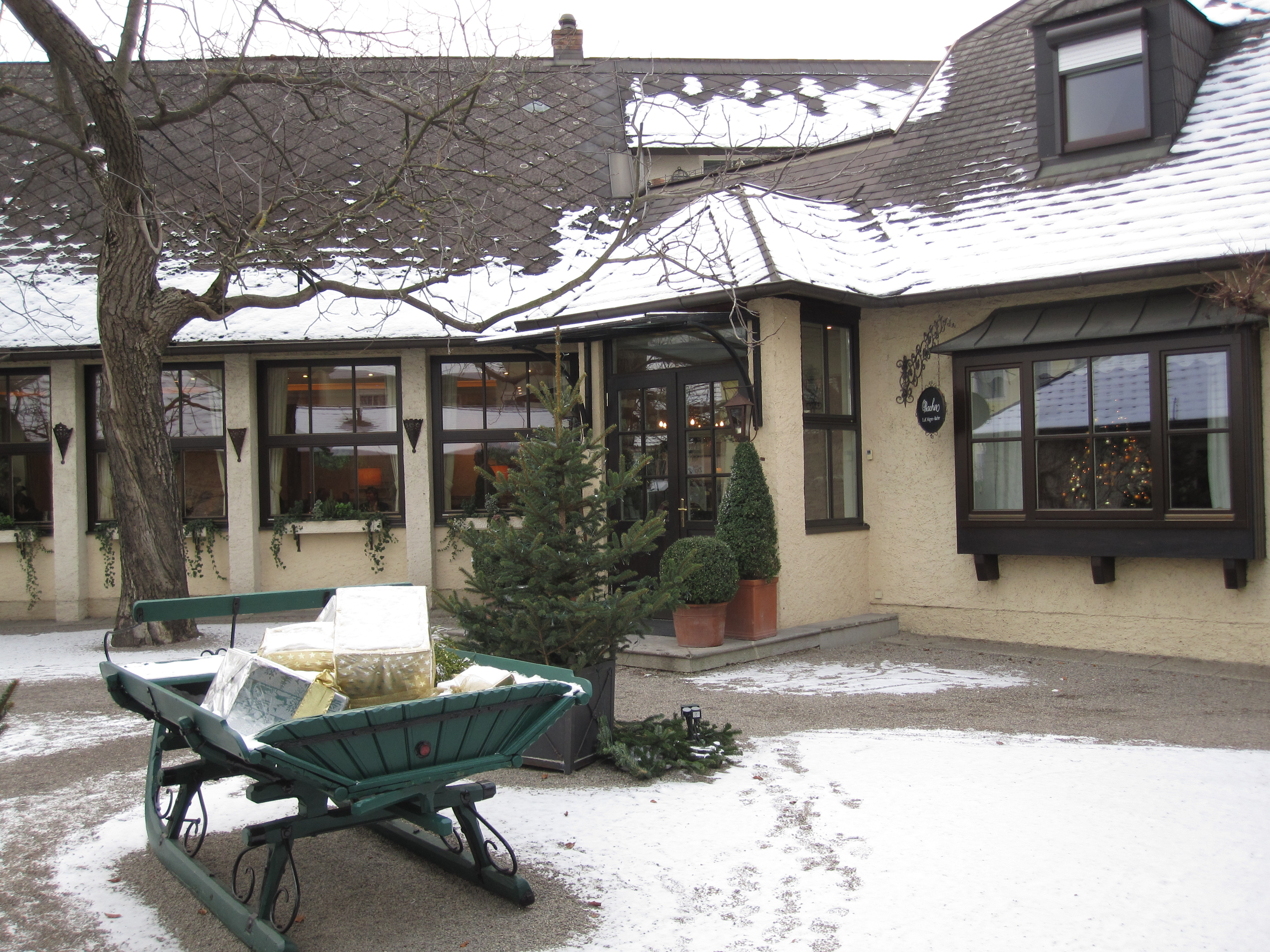
Landhaus Bacher in winter

From 2003 to 2007, Wagner-Bacher worked as a cook on the ORF program Frisch kochen (Freshly Cooked). In November 2014, she cooked again on Frisch kochen (Freshly Cooked) together with Elisabeth Engstler. In 2017, she cooked on Schmeckt perfekt (previously: Frisch kochen) about once a week.

She has two daughters.

== Awards ==
- 1981: Gault Millau – 12 points
- 1982: Gault Millau – first toque (13 points)
- 1983: Gault Millau – second toque and Chef of the Year (first for an Austrian chef)
- 1988: Gault Millau – third toque (17 points)
- 1995: Gault Millau – 18 points
- 2004: Gault Millau – 18 points
- 2005: Michelin Guide – two stars. Landhaus Bacher retained this rating until the Michelin Guide Austria was discontinued in 2010.
- The Austrian gourmet magazine “A la Carte” rated Landhaus Bacher with 97 out of a maximum of 98 points.
- 2011: Schlemmer Atlas – Top Chef of the Year
- 2012: 91st place, San Pellegrino list WORLD´S BEST RESTAURANTS
- 2012: five cooking spoons from Schlemmer Atlas

== Library ==
Wagner-Bacher maintains an extensive cookbook collection, dating back to the 17th century. The majority of the collection was donated by Lillian Langseth-Christensen an American cookbook author and contributor to American Gourmet magazine. The portion of the library donated by Langseth-Christensen to a foundation and available to Wagner-Bacher alone comprises approximately 3,500 books. The oldest item in the collection is the Pomegranate Cookbook, published in 1699 —one of the few surviving originals.

== Publications ==
- Meine Küche, 1989. ISBN 3-901003-01-0.
- Die feine Küche auf österreichische Art, 1990. ISBN 3-517-01227-0.
- Das Essen zum Wein, 2007. ISBN 3-902469-09-9.
- Zu Gast in der Wachau: Kulinarische Plaudereien und 150 köstliche Rezepte, 2008. ISBN 3-85431-454-X.
- Landhaus Bacher: Das Kochbuch – 3 Jahrzehnte Spitzengastronomie in der Wachau, 2011. ISBN 978-3-89910-496-7.
- Meine österreichische Küche, 2018.
