= 1744 in Austria =

- Decades
- See also: Other events of 1744; Timeline of Austrian history

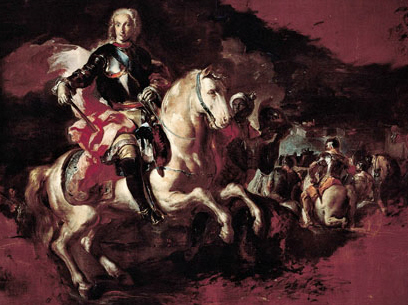
Triumph of Charles III at the Battle of Velletri

Events from the year 1744 in Austria

== Incumbents ==
- Monarch – Maria Theresa

== Events ==
- August 12 – Battle of Velletri in the Kingdom of Naples: Spanish-Neapolitan forces defeat those of the Archduchy of Austria.
- September 16 - Prussian forces capture Prague: Prussia became anxious at Austrian advances on the Rhine frontier, and Frederick again invaded Bohemia, beginning a Second Silesian War
- December 18 - Maria Theresa, Queen of Austria, orders the expulsion of Jews from Bohemia.

== Deaths ==
- January 26 – Ludwig Andreas Graf Khevenhüller, Austrian field marshal (b. 1683)
