= Franz Gräffer =

Austrian librarian, bookseller and writer

Franz Gräffer (6 January 1785 – 8 October 1852) was a librarian, bookseller and writer from the Austrian Empire. He was a founder of the Österreichische National-Encyklopädie, regarded as the first comprehensive reference work about Austria.

== Life ==
Gräffer was born in Vienna in 1785; his father August Gräffer opened in 1790 a bookshop specializing in military books, and he wrote about military history. Franz in his early career joined his father's business. He later became librarian successively for Louis Bonaparte, for Moritz von Liechtenstein and for Karl Borromäus von Harrach. Afterwards he opened an antiquarian bookshop and was a publisher, making unsuccessful plans to produce magazines. He also began the trade for autographs in Vienna.

He was a freelance writer, from 1812 writing numerous works about the cultural history and customs of Vienna, some published anonymously or pseudonymously. With Johann Jakob Czikann (1789–1855) he founded the Österreichische National-Encyklopädie (6 volumes, 1835–37), regarded as the first comprehensive reference work about Austria.

In later years he became mentally ill; he died impoverished in a mental hospital in 1852. His biographer in Biographisches Lexikon des Kaiserthums Oesterreich wrote: "Gräffer was, in his innermost character, after all no businessman, but a scholar by calling, burdened with all the weaknesses and advantages of those often eccentric people."
