= Johann Arzberger =

Austrian technologist (1778–1835)

Johann Arzberger (10 April 1778, Arzberg, Sechsämterland, Bayreuth Princedom/(today's) Upper Franconia – 28 December 1835, Vienna) was an Austrian technologist.

He worked as a manager of equipment of the Fürstlich Salm'sche Eisenwerke ("Princely Salm's Ironworks") by Hugo Franz Altgraf zu Salm-Reifferscheidt (1776–1836) in Moravia. From 1816 on, he served as a professor of mechanical technology at the Polytechnic Institute in Vienna. He published scientific articles in the field of mechanics in Gilbert's Annalen der Physik as well as in the Annals of the Polytechnic Institute in Vienna.

Arzberger was a pioneer of urban street lighting — with Johann Joseph von Prechtl (1778-1854), he developed a coal gas production plant for illumination purposes at the institute. In 1818, there were 25 operational public gas lanterns in Vienna. In 1820, he invented an early steam carriage designed for travel on ordinary roads without the need of rails. On weekends and national holidays, he gave lectures free of charge.

== Career ==
Johann Arzberger was director of the Royal Salm'sche iron works of Hugo Altgraf Franz of Salm-Reifferscheidt (1776–1836) in Moravia. In 1815 he was invited by the founder of the Imperial Polytechnic Institute (now the Technical University of Vienna) Johann Joseph Prechtl (1778-1854) to apply for the professorship for skilled mechanics and client machines. On 3 January 1816 Arzberger was awarded the Magisterium of practical teaching machines, in March of that year he took over the chair and the following November began lecturing.

In 1816 Arzberger constructed the first major facility for the production of illuminating gas from coal with Prechtl in Vienna and thus was a pioneer of urban street lighting. Vienna was the first city on the European continent that brought coal gas for lighting streets and public places on a large scale.

As a result of his work on steam power, Arzberger found a practical use for implementing a steam-powered carriage in 1820, which could move on ordinary roads without rails or any guidance. The boiler tube used in this case had already been introduced in 1816 at the Vienna Polytechnic.

His fame and popularity among artists and artisans led him to comply with a request to establish free Sunday lectures on mechanical objects. This was so widely popular that it soon was copied by millwrights, carpenters, and masons, and supported as early the principle of "preparation courses" (non-profit training schools).

== Marriage ==
Arzberger married Magdalena Holzmann in 1817, through the connection from a relative, Ernestine. However this marriage ended in 1825 with Magdalena's death. On 3 April 1826 Arzberger married Wilhelmina Josepha von Schwind, Moritz von Schwind's sister, and fathered Moritz ( 1827-1892 ), Friedrich ( * 1833, † 1905 in Rindbach at Ebensee ), and Auguste.

== Death ==
Johann Arzberger died on 28 December 1835 on the Wieden No. 54 (Paniglgasse) of apoplexy. He was buried in the cemetery beyond Matzleinsdorf.

== Honors ==
In 1907 in Hernals (Vienna's 17th district) a street was named the Arzbergergasse in memory of the founder of the Imperial Polytechnic Institute.

== Writing ==
- Representation of the law of elasticity of water vapor, and description of the employed on this subject in the Polytechnic Institute tests: Johann Joseph Prechtl ( Ed.): Yearbooks of the Imperial Royal Polytechnic Institute in Vienna. 1.1819 tape, ZDB-ID 217840-0. Gerold, Vienna, 1819, pp. 144–159. - Full-text online.
- Description of the imperial royal polytechnic institutes located Comparators than normal measure of Vienna fathoms : Johann Joseph Prechtl ( Ed.): Yearbook of the Imperial Polytechnic Institute in Vienna. 2.1820 tape, ZDB-ID 217840-0. Gerold, Vienna, 1820, pp. xxvi - xxxii.
- Comparison of the cost of maintenance of the horses for the Schiffzug with the cost of firing a steam engine to Fort bustle on the same vessel by means of rudder wheels, and the time required in both cases on the Danube upstream from Ofen to Vienna: Johann Joseph Prechtl (Ed.): Yearbook of the Imperial Polytechnic Institute in Vienna. 11.1827 tape, ZDB-ID 217840-0. Gerold, Vienna, 1827, pp. 36–56.
- About the Schiffzug upstream through water wheels which are mounted on the ships themselves: Johann Joseph Prechtl ( Ed.): Yearbook of the Imperial Polytechnic Institute in Vienna. 14.1829 tape, ZDB-ID 217840-0. Gerold, Vienna, 1829, pp. 44–61.
- A mechanical means to heat enclosed spaces and to obtain at the same temperature : Johann Joseph Prechtl ( Ed.): Yearbook of the Imperial Polytechnic Institute in Vienna. 17.1832 tape, ZDB-ID 217840-0. Gerold, Vienna, 1832, pp. 1–12.

== Literature ==
- Constant von Wurzbach: Arzberger, Johann: Biographical Dictionary of the Austrian Empire. Volume 22, published by LC Zamarski, Vienna, 1870, p 467
- Karl Karmarsch : Arzberger, Johann. : General German Biography ( ADB). Volume 1, Duncker & Humblot, Leipzig, 1875, p 616
- Alexander Bauer: Feuilleton: Johann Arzberger (1778-1835): Wiener Zeitung, No. 159/1908, 12 July 1908, pp. 2–6.
- Johann Arzberger, Machine Builders: Austrian Biographical Encyclopaedia 1815-1950. Volume 1 Austrian Academy of Sciences, Vienna 1957, pp. 32
