= Favoriten Girl Murders =

Unresolved Austrian murder case

The Favoriten Girl Murders were a series of sexually motivated crimes committed against a young woman and two young girls: Alexandra Schriefl (d. 1988, aged 20), Christina Beranek (d. 1989, aged 10) and Nicole Strau (d. 1990, aged 8) in the Viennese district of Favoriten. This case was among the most extensive and costliest investigations in Austrian history.

For a long time, the investigators believed that a single serial killer was responsible for the murders. It was not until the introduction of DNA profiling and a DNA database that the murderers of Schriefl and Strau were arrested, in 2000 and 2001, respectively. Christina Beranek's killing is the only unsolved case left, although the public prosecutor and investigators alike believe that Herbert Petsch, the man convicted of killing Alexandra, killed her as well.

== Murder of Alexandra Schriefl ==
On the night of 26 October 1988, Austria's national day, 20-year-old Alexandra Schriefl, a local saleswoman, was attacked, abused and strangled. She had previously been to the "Azzurro" discotheque on Himberger Street with some friends, and was last seen at a nearby telephone booth around 2:30, from where she called her boyfriend to pick her up. When the boyfriend arrived, however, Alexandra was gone. When she had not shown up in the morning, a search was initiated. It was not until eleven hours after she vanished that her naked body was found tied to a tree behind a billboard on Himberger Street. She had been strangled with her own sweater and stockings.

The investigators looked for a masked man who had molested and attacked women in this area several times since July, a cab driver who, according to testimony, had spoken to Alexandra and was seen in front of the discotheque, as well as three young boys who, according to another testimony, were seen following Schriefl after she had left the building. Within a few weeks, more than 500 people were questioned, including visitors to the discotheque and a nearby bowling alley, as well as sex offenders living in the area. However, the culprit remained unidentified.

On 11 November 1988, Alexandra Schriefl was buried in the Vienna Central Cemetery, with her funeral attended by over 250 mourners.

== Murder of Christina Beranek ==
On 2 February 1989, 10-year-old Christina Beranek disappeared while on her way home from school on Josef-Enslein-Platz in Favoriten. She was last seen alive shortly before 5 PM, when she bought a Mickey Mouse notebook from a tobacconist in Per-Albin-Hansson-Siedlung.

After searching for her, Christina's father found her on the 14th floor of house number 2 on Per-Albin-Hansson-Siedlung, at around 11 AM the following morning. The girl was partially undressed, abused, strangled and tied with her clothes to the railing. Forensics determined that she was killed between 5 and 10 PM the day before, with the perpetrator intercepting her shortly after she visited the tobacconist a few meters away from her house. It remained unclear whether he killed her immediately or moved her to another place in the house first. The girl's school-bag had been discarded on the lower floor, which contained a universal key purchasable from hardware stores.

The investigators immediately established a connection to Schriefl's murder, as this crime scene was less than a five minute walk away and the perpetrator had acted in a similar manner. In addition, in both cases, the killer had taken an article of clothing as a "trophy". The police suspected the perpetrator lived in Per-Albin-Hansson-Siedlung, one of the largest municipal housing estates in Vienna, with over 11,000 inhabitants at the time.

What followed was the most extensive investigation in Austrian criminal history. The investigators examined around 1,000 people in Favoriten alone, including all 580 male residents of the complex who were older than 13 years. In addition, all 650 apartments were checked, in one case even with a court order. The entire floor on which Christina had been murdered was cut off and taken to the laboratory, with assistance provided by the Wiesbaden department of the German Federal Police. Hundreds of posters were put up in the area, on which Christina was shown in a color photo montage with the clothes she had worn on the day of her murder, with the Viennese municipality assuming all costs. The award for vital information about the crime was 160,000 schillings (around 22,000 euros on present-day currency).

On 13 February, the officials finally believed that they had caught their killer: an officer from Lower Austria, who had been stationed in Vienna years ago, tracked down 20-year-old Werner K. In 1984, he had sexually molested nine little girls in elevators in Per-Albin-Hansson-Siedlung, including one at the staircase where Beranek's body was found. The officers also found out that he had gone to the same school as Schriefl, and had no credible alibi for the night of the murder. Despite these coincidences, he was exonerated by a blood group test for Schrielf's killing, and proved to have a solid alibi on the night of Christina's death.

On 17 February, Christina Beranek was buried in the crematorium of the Vienna Central Cemetery. Among the more than 400 mourners was then-Interior Minister Franz Löschnak.

== Murder of Nicole Strau ==
On 22 December 1990, around 5:30 PM, 8-year-old Nicole Strau was on her way home after visiting her uncle, who lived in Simmeringer Hauptstrasse. She used tram line 71 and then changed to bus 15 A, but after that, her trail was lost.

Her body was found the next day at around 10:20 AM in the Laa Forest. The forensic examination determined that Nicole had been raped, with the cause of death being strangulation, her killer using a broken branch to beat her, and her shoelaces to ultimately strangle her.

In this case, over 1,600 people were investigated for possible involvement, but the killer remained elusive.

== Investigation ==
All three murders occurred in the same area, were young females, raped and strangled. The murders occurred in 26 months, with the killers uncaptured. As the first two victims were murdered in almost identical ways, this led investigators to believe for a long time that they were dealing with a serial offender. Almost 4,000 people were examined and questioned, including hundreds of men who had already been convicted of sexual offenses.

Additional investigations conducted by the crew of Aktenzeichen XY… ungelöst on the murders of Schriefl and Beranek (September 1989) and Strau (January 1991) failed to uncover new leads.

At that time, there were no genealogical tests in Austria, only the less precise blood group tests.

When the DNA database was introduced on 1 October 1997, Alexandra Schriefl's DNA was among the first to be included. The only thing missing now was a sample from a suspect.

== Arrests and convictions ==
In September 2000, chance came to aid the investigators. Herbert Petsch (born 1968) was involved in a scuffle and attacked the intervening police officers, for which he was therefore arrested for civil disobedience. At the time, it was customary to take an oral cavity swab from the suspect for this class of offences, including for Herbert Petsch. Three weeks later, a DNA match was made to the Schriefl case. Herbert Petsch was arrested on 1 October 2000 on suspicion of murder. He was among the first suspects questioned after the night of the murder in 1988, but due to a mistake at the Forensic Medicinal Institute in Vienna, an incorrect blood type was determined from him, and he was eliminated as a suspect.

As a result, the files for the other two murders were reviewed anew. The 25 closest suspects in the Nicole Strau case were again scrutinized, with the criminalists asking each of them for a DNA sample. Only one, Michael Petzl (born 1966), a known criminal, could not be located. At the time of Nicole's murder, he was in a relationship with her aunt, from whom he received an alibi at the time. On 27 September 2001, he was arrested near his home. He refused both to testify and to give a DNA sample, much like he did back in the 1990s, and was simply forgotten. This time, however, he was ordered by a judge to give a sample, which was applied in spite of his persistent refusals. On 28 November, he was linked to Strau's murder via his DNA.

In the meantime, Herbert Petsch was sentenced to 15 years imprisonment on 11 December 2011, for Alexandra Schriefl's murder, spared from the maximum sentence of 19 years. On 13 June 2002, his appeal was discarded and the sentence finalized. He was additionally charged with Beranek's murder, but since DNA traces couldn't be acquired anymore, the proceedings were discontinued. Criminal psychologist Thomas Müller and public prosecutor Ernst Kloyber testified, however, that Herbert Petsch was certainly guilty of the killing.

On 2 December 2003, Michael Petzl was sentenced to life imprisonment for Nicole Strau's murder. During the sentencing, the jury's decisions caused a stir. Although the chances were less than one in a quadrillion according to forensic medicine, one of the jurors pointed out to another person with the same genetic characteristics. For example, there was a 7:1 guilty decision on the sexual abuse charge. Two of the jurors believed him to the rapist, but not the killer. For the murder charge, the decision was 5:3 for his guilt. If only one other juror had voted otherwise, the decision would have been 4:4 and the accused would have been acquitted.

== Television ==
An episode from the documentary series Im Kopf des Verbrechers, presented by Joe Bausch, was dedicated to this case.

== See also ==
- List of unsolved murders (1980–1999)
