= Maria Pauer =

Maria Pauer (born October 1734 or 1736 – 6 October 1750) was the last woman executed for witchcraft in the territory of present-day Austria. She is frequently referred to in media as the "Mühldorf Witch".

== Life ==
Maria Pauer was a maid in the Katharinenvorstadt district of Mühldorf (now in Bavaria, at that time part of the Prince-Archbishopric of Salzburg). In January 1749, she ran an errand to another house, which soon afterward displayed typical phenomena associated with alleged haunting. These included knocking sounds and moving objects. These phenomena were linked to Maria Pauer's presence, and she was subsequently arrested.

The conditions of her imprisonment soon left her weak and apathetic. Over the following two months, she was interrogated according to fixed interrogation protocols and required to answer a catalogue of 557 questions. The search for accomplices quickly began, and both her mother Anna Maria Zötlin and Liesel Gusterer were arrested and executed that same year.

Maria Pauer was subsequently transferred to Salzburg and interrogated again. There, presumably due to confusion and exhaustion, she made a confession and was sentenced to death by the sword with burning of the corpse. This sentence was carried out on 6 October 1750.

In 2009, the Archbishop of Salzburg, Alois Kothgasser, issued a statement regarding the "judicial murder" of Maria Pauer as presumably the last woman executed for witchcraft on the soil of present-day Austria, describing it as "a terrible crime."
