= 1741 in Austria =

- Decades
- See also: Other events of 1741; Timeline of Australian history

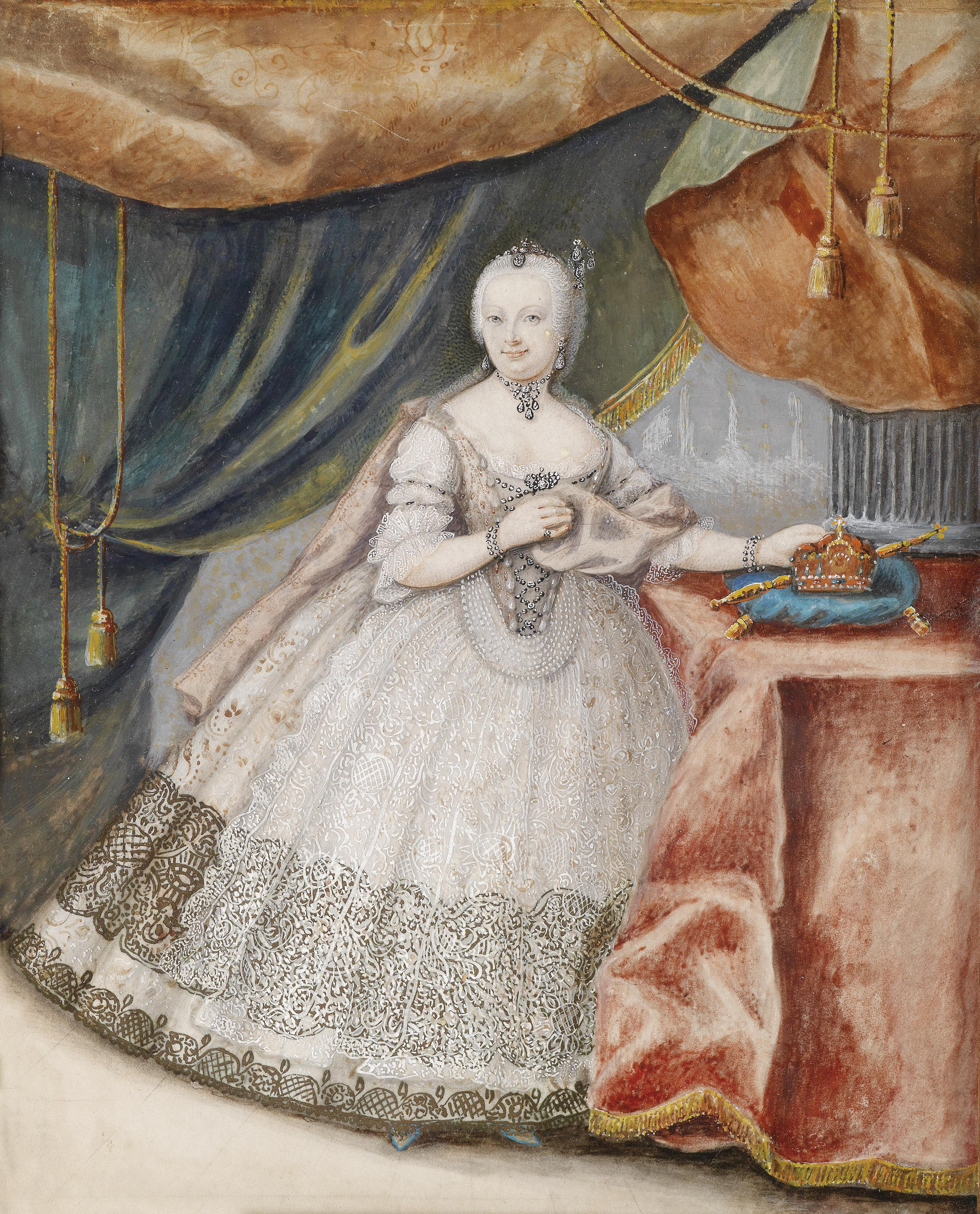
Portrait of Empress Maria Theresa, about 1740

Events from the year 1741 in Austria

== Incumbents ==
- Monarch – Maria Theresa

== Events ==
- The Prussian Army took control of Breslau from the Austro-Hungarian Army in 2 January and a fortress in Ohlau on 9 January. Within the month, the entire Silesian area was captured.
- The Battle of Mollwitz began on 10 April 1741, part of the larger War of the Austrian Succession.

== Births ==
- 13 March - Emperor Joseph II of the Holy Roman Empire

== Deaths ==
- 25 January - Archduchess Maria Carolina of Austria (b.1740).
- 13 February - Johann Joseph Fux, Austrian composer (b 1660).
- 5 May – Eleonore von Schwarzenberg, a princess of Schwarzenberg (b. 1682).
- 30 July - Count Wirich Philipp von Daun, Austrian Field Marshal (b. 1669).
- 26 August - Archduchess Maria Elisabeth of Austria (b. 1680).
