= 1747 in Austria =

- Decades
- See also: Other events of 1747; Timeline of Austrian history

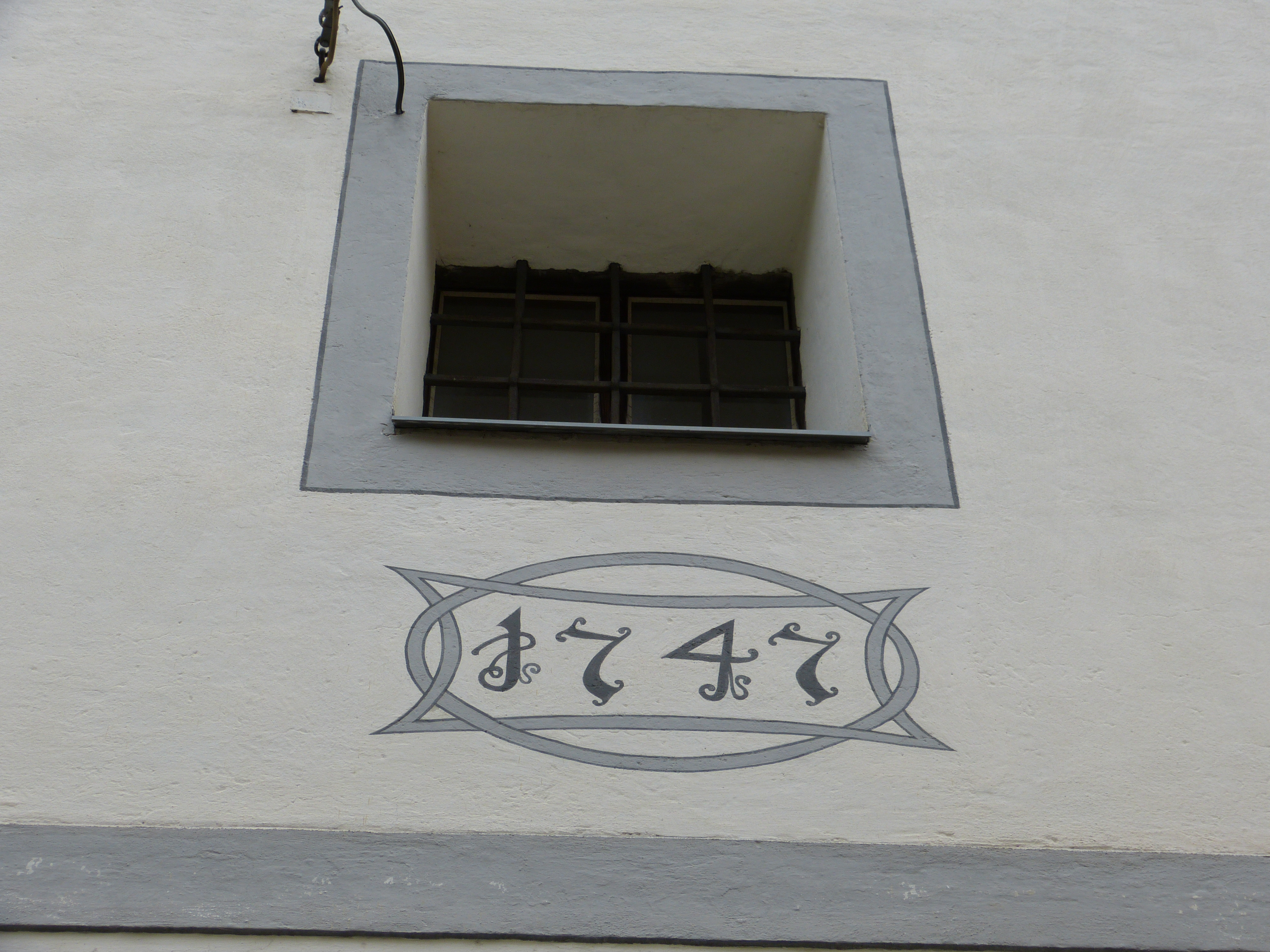
St. Nicholas Parish Church in Sirnitz. Inscription "1747" on the tower.

Events from the year 1747 in Austria.

== Incumbents ==
- Monarch – Maria Theresa
- Mayor of Vienna Andreas Ludwig Leitgeb
- Governor of the Austrian Netherlands — Prince Charles Alexander of Lorraine

== Events ==
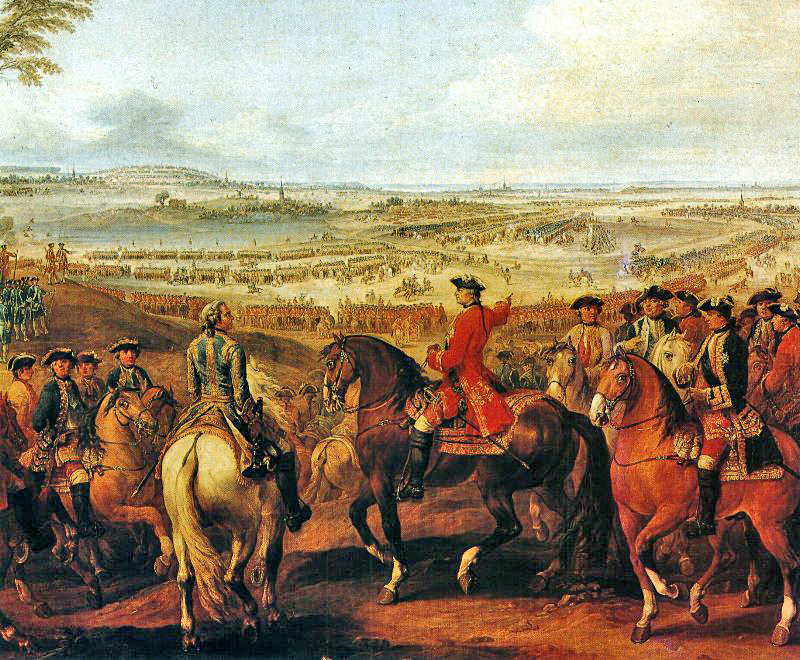
- Battle of Lauffeldt
- January — War of the Austrian Succession – In the Hague Convention, Britain agreed to fund Austrian and Sardinian forces in Italy, and an Allied army of 140,000 in Flanders.
- February 1 — War of the Austrian Succession – the Siege of Antibes ends, with the Allies beginning the retreat to Italy.
- March 22 — The Prussian ambassador in Vienna, Count Otto Christoph von Podewils, described the then five-year-old Maria Christina as pretty and witty.
- May 14 – War of the Austrian Succession – First battle of Cape Finisterre: British victory over the French.
- July 2 – War of the Austrian Succession – Battle of Lauffeld: France defeats the armies of Hanover, Great Britain and the Netherlands.
- August — Ferdinand Bonaventura II von Harrach is appointed Governor of the Duchy of Milan.
- October 4 — Schlosstheater Schönbrunn opens on the name day of Maria Theresa's husband, Francis I, Holy Roman Emperor.
- October 25 – War of the Austrian Succession – Second battle of Cape Finisterre: The British Navy defeats the French fleet.
- November 21 – Mozart's parents, Anna Maria Mozart and Leopold Mozart, marry in Salzburg.

=== Undated ===
- War of the Austrian Succession:
  - Spanish troops invade and occupy the coastal towns of Beaufort and Brunswick in the Royal Colony of North Carolina during what becomes known as the Spanish Alarm. They are later driven out by the local militia.
  - András Hadik is appointed the rank of General and commander of a cavalry brigade.
  - Paul II Anton is appointed Fieldmarshal-Lieutenant due to his successes in the War of Austrian Succession.
  - Austrian Maximilian Ulysses Brownehe is appointed commander of all imperial forces in Italy, replacing Antoniotto Botta Adorno.
- Sigismund von Schrattenbach is appointed administrator of Hohenwerfen Castle.

== Births ==
- May 5 — Leopold II (Peter Leopold Josef Anton Joachim Pius Gotthard)
- April 30 — Maria Theresa, daughter of Joseph of Schwarzenberg and wife of Siegmund von Goëss
- Joseph, son of Franz Wenzel von Wallis
- Antoinette von der Oeynhausen-Schulenburg, daughter of Ludwig von Schulenburg-Oeynhausen

== Gallery ==
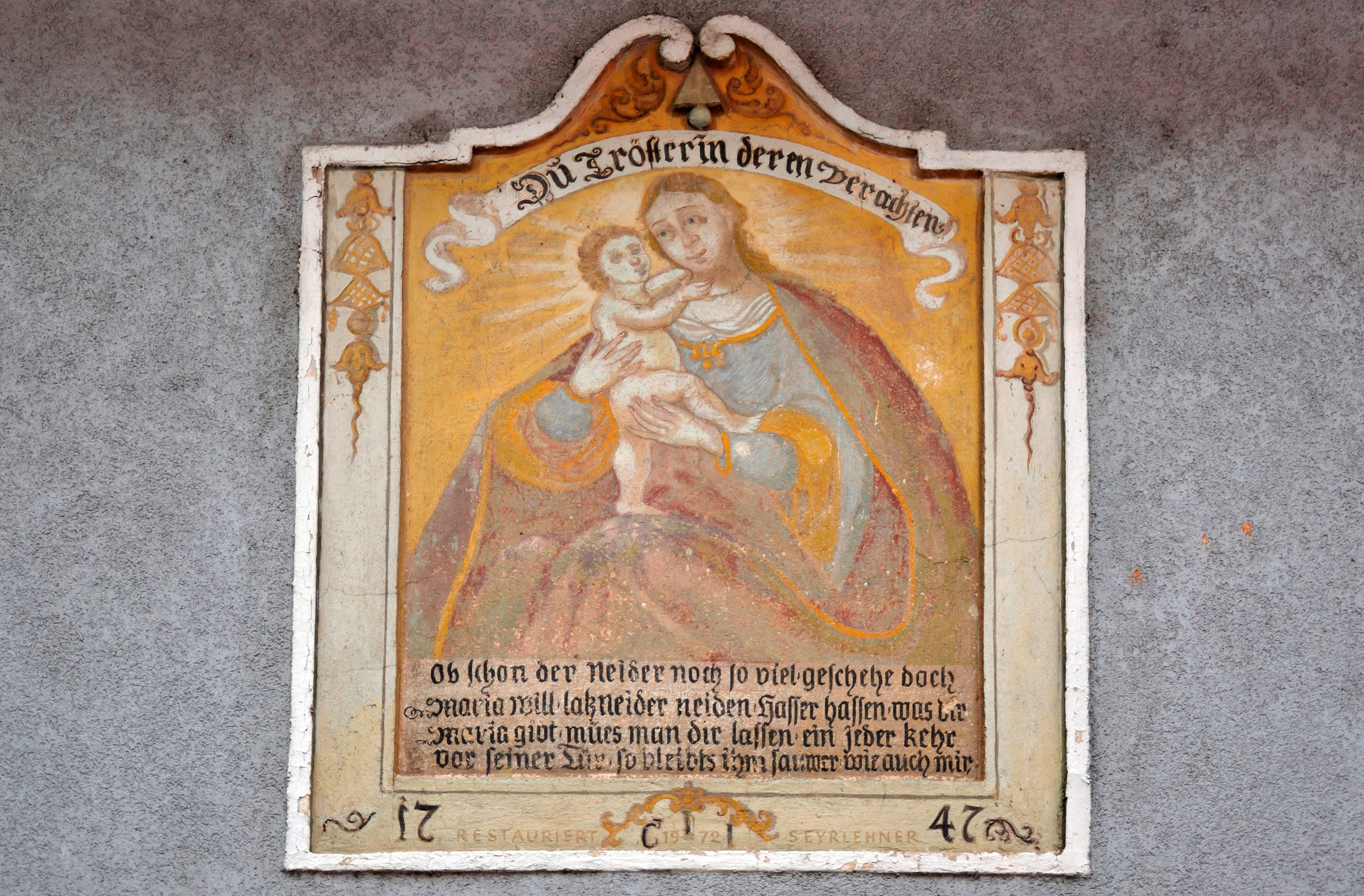
Painting of Madonna and Child in Enns, Upper Austria (1747)

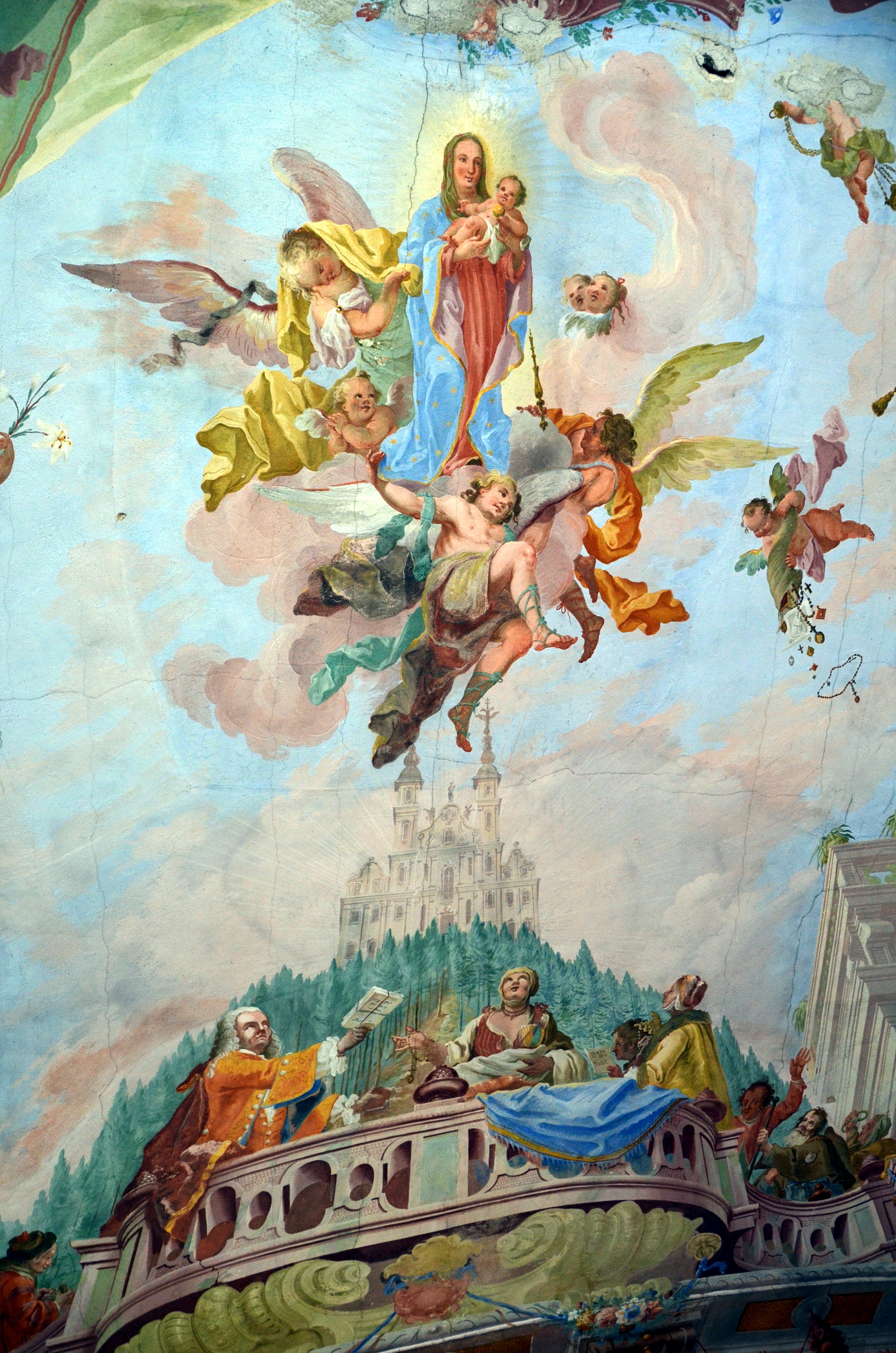
Fresco painted by Johann Baptist Scheidt in 1747, on the ceiling Mariatrost Basilica

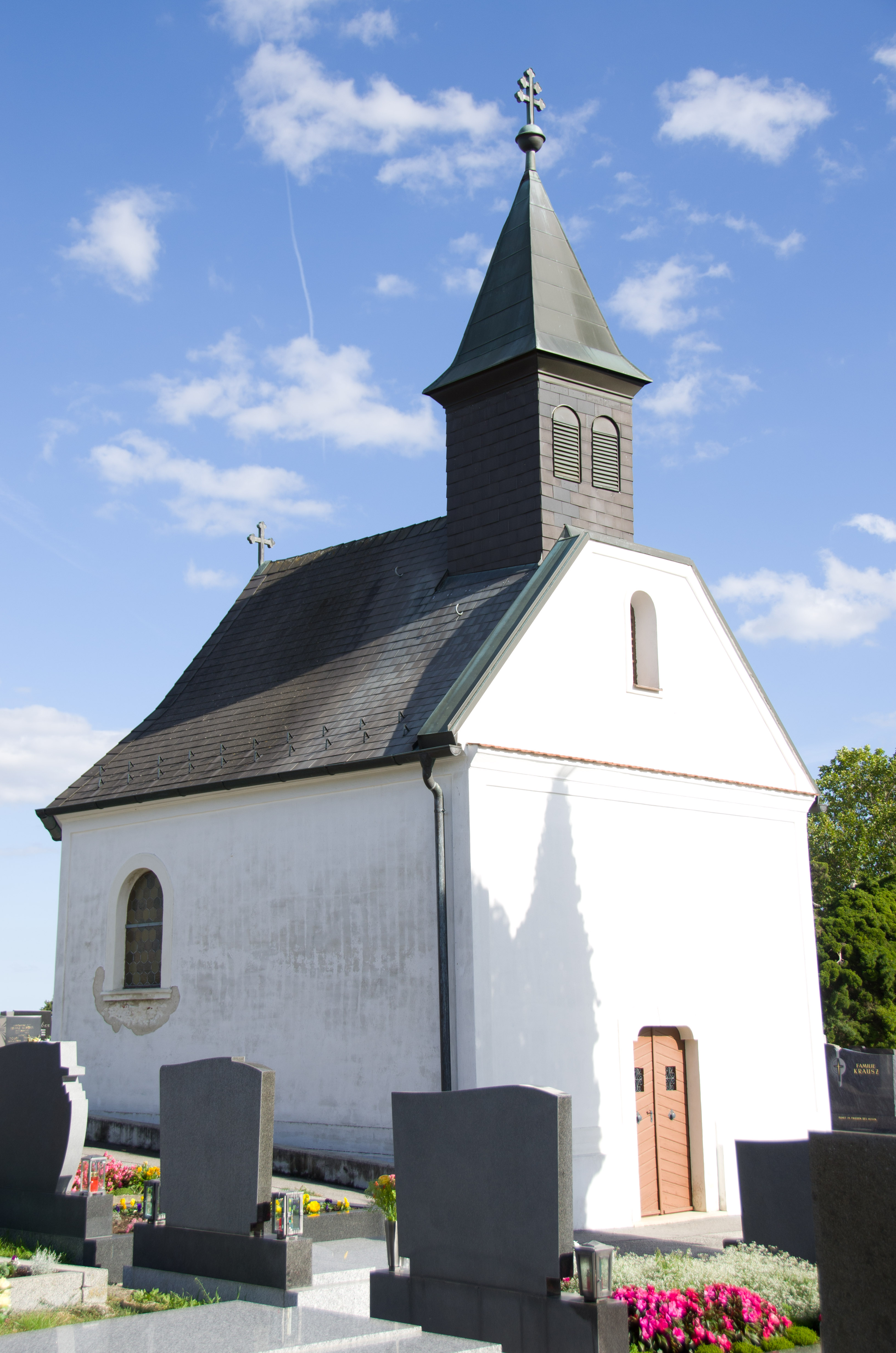
Cemetery chapel in Neckenmarkt, Austria, built 1747

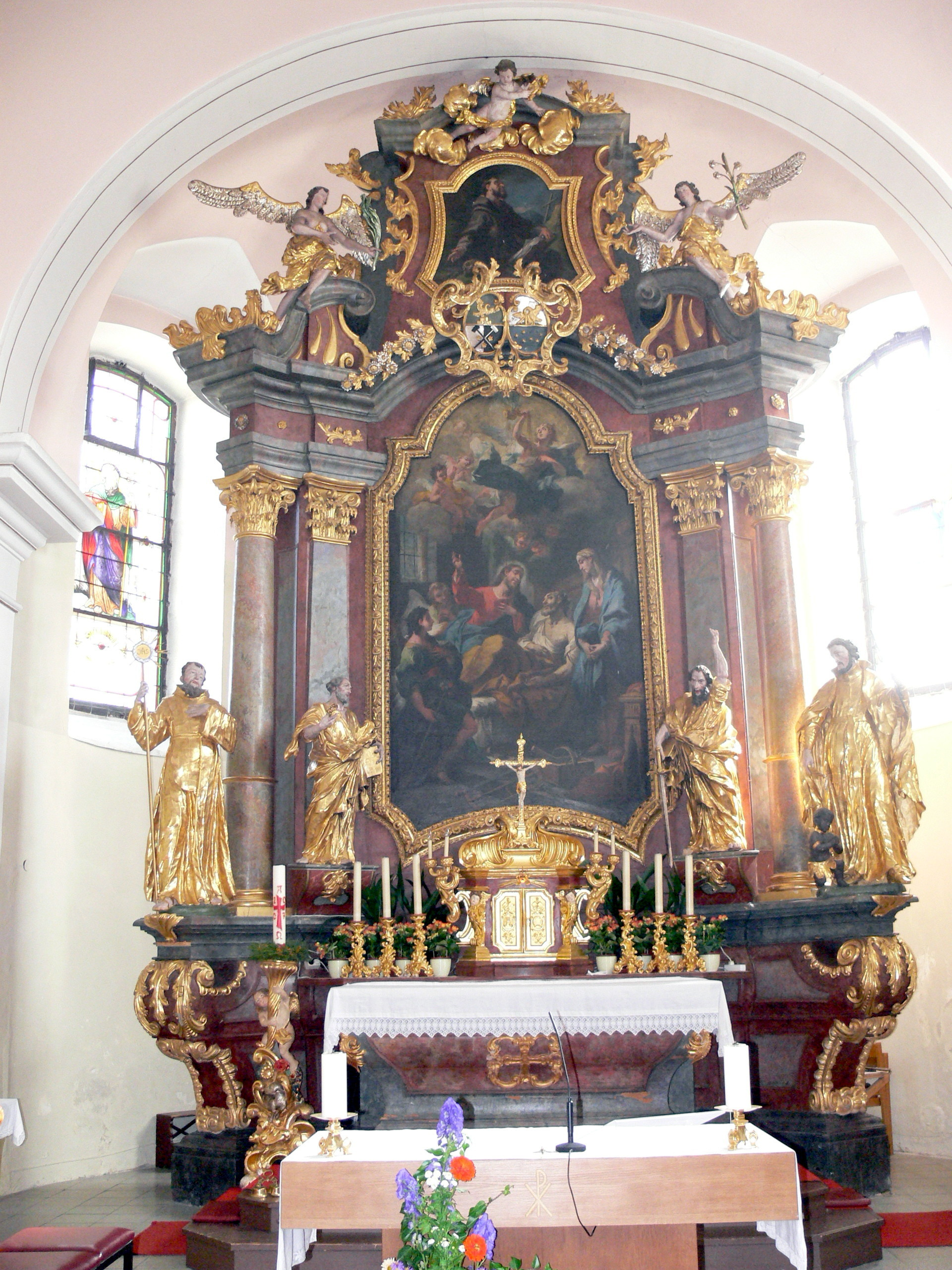
High altar in St. Joseph Parish Church, 1747

== Works cited ==
- Hochedlinger, Michael (2003). Austria's Wars of Emergence, 1683-1797. Routledge. ISBN 978-0582290846.

Media related to 1747 in Austria at Wikimedia Commons
