= Madonna del Terremoto (Mantua) =

Church building in Mantua, Italy

Coordinates: 45.1600°N 10.7929°E

Church of the Madonna del Terremoto
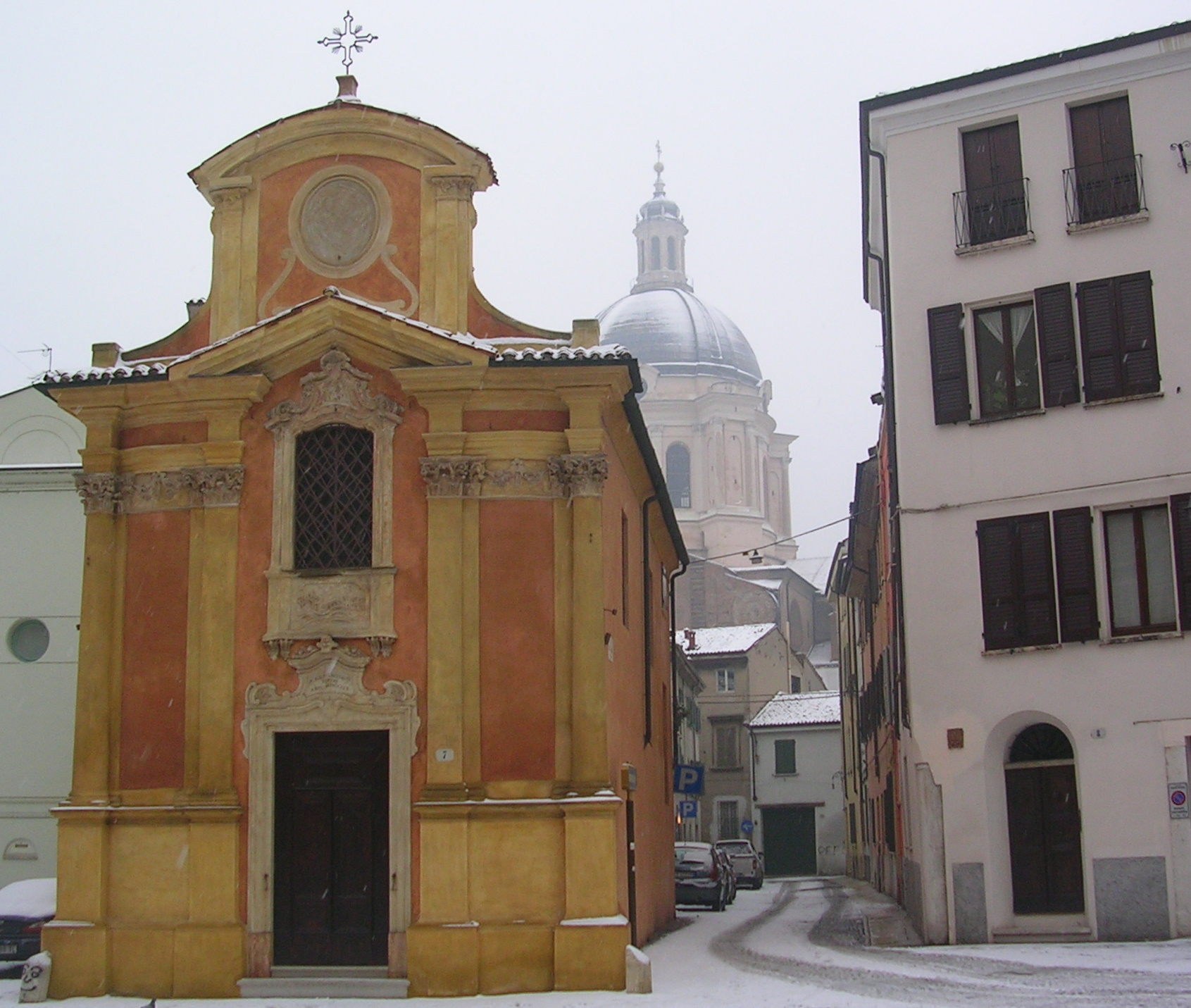
- Façade with dome of the Basilica di Sant'Andrea in background

Religion
- Affiliation: Roman Catholic

Location
- Location: Mantua, Italy
- Interactive map of Church of the Madonna del Terremoto

Architecture
- Type: Church
- Style: Baroque
- Groundbreaking: 1754

The Church of the Madonna del Terremoto (Madonna of the Earthquake) is a small Baroque style, Roman Catholic church in central Mantua, region of Lombardy, Italy.

The small votive church was built in 1754 in gratitude to the Virgin for her perceived protection after the 1693 Sicily earthquake. The Baroque church contained, at one time, two altarpieces by Giuseppe Bazzani, the Adoration by the Shepherds and a Pietà. They are now in the Diocesan museum in Mantua.
