= 1937 in Austria =

Events from the year 1937 in Austria

== Incumbents ==
- President: Wilhelm Miklas
- Chancellor: Kurt Schuschnigg

=== Governors ===
- Burgenland: Hans Sylvester
- Carinthia: Arnold Sucher
- Lower Austria: Josef Reither
- Salzburg: Franz Rehrl
- Styria: Karl Maria Stepan
- Tyrol: Josef Schumacher
- Upper Austria: Heinrich Gleißner
- Vienna: Richard Schmitz
- Vorarlberg: Ernst Winsauer

== Births ==
- 25 January - Werner Schneyder, writer, director, and actor (died 2019)
- 16 July - Kurt Mrkwicka, diver
