= Johann Joseph von Prechtl =

German-born Austrian technologist and educator

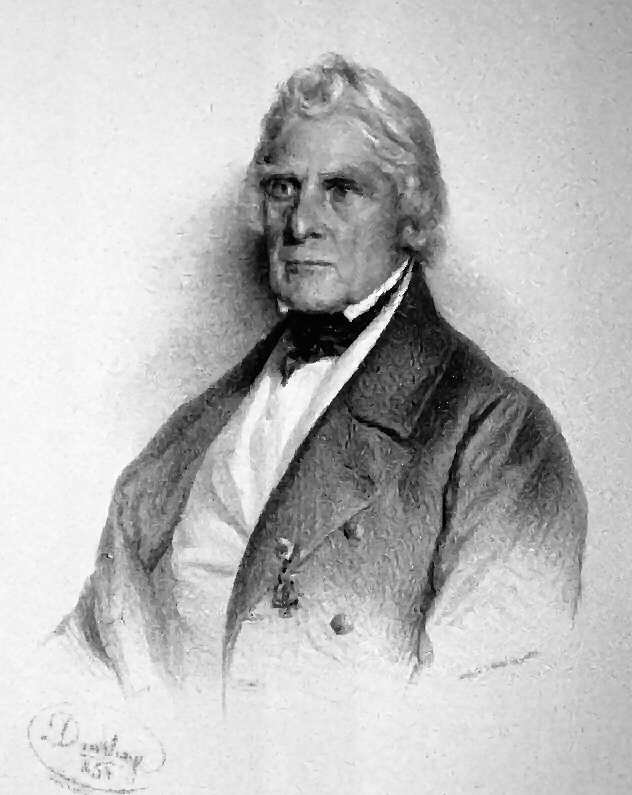
Johann Joseph von Prechtl (1778–1854)

Johann Joseph Ritter von Prechtl (16 November 1778, Bischofsheim, Grand-Dukal Würzburg (today's) Lower Franconia – 28 October 1854, Wieden No. 54 (today's Paniglgasse, 4th district of Vienna)) was a German-born Austrian (since 1802) technologist and educator. He is regarded as a pioneer of technical education in Austria.

From 1796 he studied philosophy, theology and legal science in Würzburg, later working as a private instructor outside of Brünn, and afterwards as a teacher of natural sciences, chemistry and physics at a secondary school in Vienna (1810–14). In 1815 he became founder and first director of the Vienna Polytechnic Institute.

With Johann Arzberger (1778–1835), he conducted research of public gas illumination, being credited with introducing a coal gas generating plant at the institute. Reportedly, in 1818, there were 25 operational public gas lanterns in Vienna. In 1823 he developed a portable baroscope.

== Written works ==
With Karl Karmarsch (1803–79), he was editor of a multi-volume encyclopedia of technology, Technologische Encyklopädie oder alphabetisches Handbuch der Technologie, der technischen Chemie und des Maschinenwesens (Technological encyclopedia or an alphabetic textbook of technology, chemical engineering and mechanical engineering). Begun in 1830, the encyclopedia consisted of twenty volumes, with five supplementary volumes being issued by Karmarsch after Prechtl's death (from 1857 to 1869). Other noteworthy written efforts by Prechtl include:

- Ueber die Fehler in der Erziehung, vorzüglich in Hinsicht auf die gesellschaftlichen Uebel, 1804 – On errors in education in terms of social ills.
- Anleitung zur zweckmäßigsten Einrichtung der Apparate zur Beleuchtung mit Steinkohlen-Gas 1817 – Guide to the most appropriate device for lighting appliances with coal gas.
- Praktische Dioptrik als vollständige und gemeinfassliche Anleitung zur Verfertigung achromatischer Fernröhre : nach den neuesten Verbesserungen und Hülfsmitteln und eigenen Erfahrungen. 1828 – Practical dioptrics as complete and comprehensible instructions for construction of achromatic telescopes.

== Commemoration ==
. Since 1886, the Prechtlgasse in the Alsergrund district of Vienna has been named in his honor.
