= 2011 in Austria =

- Decades: 1990s; 2000s; 2010s; 2020s
- See also: Other events of 2011; List of years in Austria

Events from the year 2011 in Austria

== Incumbents ==
- President: Heinz Fischer
- Chancellor: Werner Faymann

=== Governors ===
- Burgenland: Hans Niessl
- Carinthia: Gerhard Dörfler
- Lower Austria: Erwin Pröll
- Salzburg: Gabi Burgstaller
- Styria: Franz Voves
- Tyrol: Günther Platter
- Upper Austria: Josef Pühringer
- Vienna: Michael Häupl
- Vorarlberg:
  - Herbert Sausgruber (till December 7, 2011)
  - Markus Wallner (since December 7, 2011)

== Events ==
- July 16: The funeral of Otto von Habsburg takes place in Vienna attended by over 100,000 people

== Deaths ==
=== January ===
- January 3: Alfred Proksch, 102, Austrian athlete and graphic designer.
- January 6: Rudi Bass, 96, Austrian-born American graphic artist, illustrator and writer.
- January 15: Hilde Zach, 68, Austrian politician, Mayor of Innsbruck (2002–2010).
- January 30: Michael Herzog, 58, Austrian ice hockey player.

=== February ===
- February 1: Ernst Badian, 85, Austrian classical scholar and history professor (Harvard University), complications from a fall.
- February 7: Maria Altmann, 94, Austrian-born American art heiress, after long illness.
- February 12: Peter Alexander, 84, Austrian actor and singer.

=== March ===
- March 15: Yakov Kreizberg, 51, Russian-born Austrian-American conductor.
- March 19: Gustav Lantschner, 100, Austrian Olympic silver medal-winning (1936) alpine skier and actor.
- March 29: Edith Klestil, 78, Austrian first lady (1992–1998), first wife of President Thomas Klestil, cancer.
- March 31: Claudia Heill, 29, Austrian judoka, silver medalist at the 2004 Summer Olympics, suspected suicide.

=== April ===
- April 17: Eric Gross, 84, Austrian-born Australian composer.
- April 20: Erwin Strahl, 82, Austrian actor.

=== May ===
- May 5: Friedrich Rückert, 90, Austrian Olympic hockey player.
- May 30: Hans Nogler, 91, Austrian Olympic alpine skier.

=== June ===
- June 6: Werner Fischer, 70, Austrian Olympic sailor.
- June 14: Milivoj Ašner, 98, Croatian-born Austrian Nazi war criminal.
- June 25: Dorothea Austin, 89, Austrian-born American pianist and composer.

=== July ===
- July 4: Otto von Habsburg, 98, Austro-Hungarian royal and politician, MEP (1979–1999).
- July 6:
  - Andreas Waldherr, 43, Austrian rally driver, workshop accident.
  - Gabriele Zeilinger, 93, Austrian Olympic fencer.
- July 21: Franz Alt, 100, Austrian-born American mathematician.

=== August ===
- August 11: Johann Traxler, 52, Austrian Olympic cyclist.
- August 14: Fritz Bach, 77, Austrian-born American transplant physician and immunologist.

=== September ===
- September 6: Archduke Felix of Austria, 95, Austrian royal, last surviving child of Charles I of Austria.
- September 25: Sissy Löwinger, 70, Austrian actress, daughter of Paul Löwinger.

=== October ===
- October 10: Otto Tausig, 89, Austrian writer, director and actor.
- October 18: Michael Staikos, 65, Greek-born Austrian Orthodox hierarch, metropolitan bishop of Austria (since 1991).
- October 28: Arnold Ruiner, 74, Austrian Olympic cyclist.

=== November ===
- November 11: Hellmut May, 90, Austrian Olympic figure skater.
- November 12: Evelyn Lauder, 75, Austrian-born American philanthropist (The Breast Cancer Research Foundation), creator of pink ribbon symbol, complications from ovarian cancer.
- November 19: Peter Steinwender, 83, Austrian Olympian
- November 22:
  - Sena Jurinac, 90, Bosnian-born Austrian opera singer.
  - Georg Kreisler, 89, Austrian-born American cabarettist, satirist, composer and author.
- November 24: Ludwig Hirsch, 65, Austrian singer and actor, suicide by self-defenestration.

=== December ===
- December 29: Leopold Hawelka, 100, Austrian coffee house owner (Café Hawelka).
