= 2018 in Austria =

- Decades: 1990s; 2000s; 2010s; 2020s
- See also: Other events of 2018; List of years in Austria

Events in the year 2018 in Austria.

== Incumbents ==
- President: Alexander Van der Bellen
- Chancellor: Sebastian Kurz

=== Governors ===
- Burgenland: Hans Niessl
- Carinthia: Peter Kaiser
- Lower Austria: Johanna Mikl-Leitner
- Salzburg: Wilfried Haslauer Jr.
- Styria: Hermann Schützenhöfer
- Tyrol: Günther Platter
- Upper Austria: Thomas Stelzer
- Vienna: Michael Häupl (until 24 May); Michael Ludwig (from 24 May)
- Vorarlberg: Markus Wallner

== Events ==
=== February ===
- 2-3 February — Cyclone Burglind
- 12 February — Niklasdorf train collision
- February 28: Controversial police raid on the headquarters of Austria's domestic intelligence agency (BVT).

=== May ===
- May 28 – Austrian Chancellor Sebastian Kurz announces to cut benefit for foreigners at 564 euros.he says “The fundamental rule we will introduce is that German will become the key to accessing the full minimum benefit,” “That means that whoever has insufficient language skills will not be able to claim the full minimum benefit".

=== June ===
- June 8 – Austrian Chancellor Sebastian Kurz announces its closing seven mosques and could expel up to 40 imams from the country. the mosques were accused of preaching Salafi positions and they were funded by turkey.

== Deaths ==
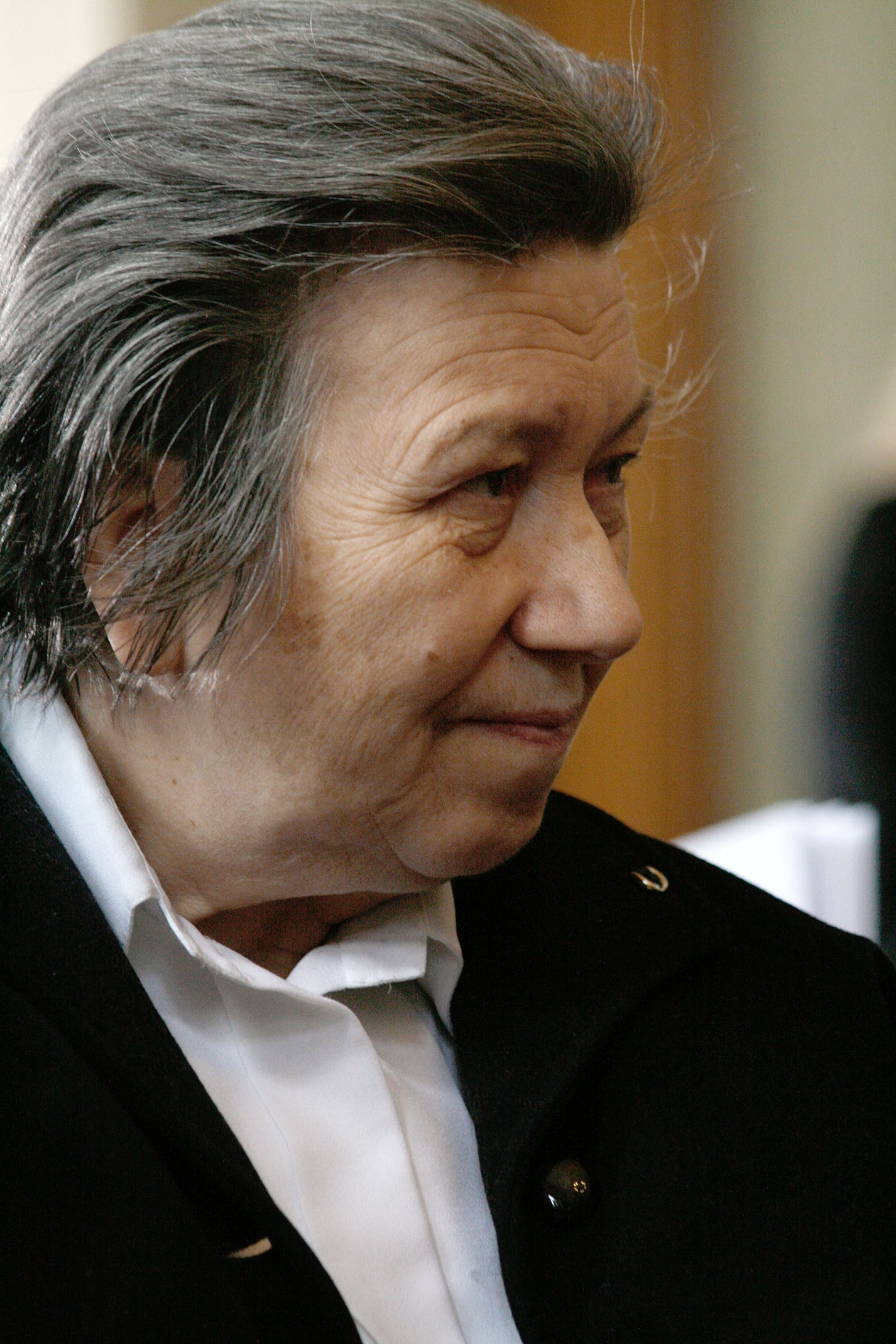
Ute Bock

- 1 January – Konrad Ragossnig, classical guitarist (b. 1932).
- 13 January – Walter Schuster, alpine skier (b. 1929)
- 19 January – Ute Bock, educator and humanitarian (b. 1942).
- 26 February – Thomas Pernes, composer (b. 1956)
- 3 March – Franz Pacher, engineer (b. 1919)
- 21 March – Martha Wallner, actress (b. 1927)
- 20 July – Heinz Schilcher, footballer (b. 1947).
- 24 October – Rudolf Gelbard, Holocaust survivor (b. 1930)
