= 2012 in Austria =

- Decades: 1990s; 2000s; 2010s; 2020s
- See also: Other events of 2012; List of years in Austria

Events from the year 2012 in Austria

== Incumbents ==
- President: Heinz Fischer
- Chancellor: Werner Faymann

=== Governors ===
- Burgenland: Hans Niessl
- Carinthia: Gerhard Dörfler
- Lower Austria: Erwin Pröll
- Salzburg: Gabi Burgstaller
- Styria: Franz Voves
- Tyrol: Günther Platter
- Upper Austria: Josef Pühringer
- Vienna: Michael Häupl
- Vorarlberg: Markus Wallner

== Events ==
- 25 September – The right-wing populist political party Team Stronach led by Frank Stronach is officially registered, launching two days later.
- 14 October – Austrian skydiver Felix Baumgartner becomes the first person to break the sound barrier without any machine assistance during a record space dive out of the Red Bull Stratos helium-filled balloon from 24 miles (39 kilometers) over Roswell, New Mexico in the United States.
- 27 October – The liberal political party NEOS hold its founding convention. Matthias Strolz is elected as its first chairman.
- 25 November – 2012 Graz local election

== Deaths ==
=== January–June ===
- 2 January: Otto Scrinzi, 93, Austrian journalist and politician.
- 8 January:
  - Franz Berger, 71, Austrian Olympic wrestler.
  - Franz Dorfer, 61, Austrian Olympic boxer (1976).
- 9 January: Francis Golffing, 101, Austrian-American poet, essayist, teacher, and translator.
- 20 January: Ruthilde Boesch, 94, Austrian singer
- 14 February: Reinhold Frosch, 76, Austrian luger
- 28 February: Fritz Hakl, 80, Austrian actor.
- 29 February: Karl Kodat, 69, Austrian international footballer.
- 13 March: Julius Depaoli, 88, Austrian Olympic water polo player.
- 14 March:
  - Gretl Aicher, 84, Austrian artistic director.
  - Margareta Sjöstedt, 88, Swedish-born Austrian singer and actress.
- 5 April — Ferdinand Alexander Porsche, German car designer (born 1935)
- 11 May: Thea Hochleitner, 86, Austrian Olympic bronze medal-winning (1956) alpine skier.
- 14 May: Ernst Hinterberger, 80, Austrian author and screenwriter (Kaisermühlen Blues, Ein echter Wiener geht nicht unter).
- 21 May: Bahram Alivandi, 83–84, Iranian-born Austrian artist.
- 30 May: Edi Federer, 57, Austrian ski jumper, amyotrophic lateral sclerosis.
- 15 June: Günther Domenig, 77, Austrian architect.

=== July–December ===
- 1 July: Fritz Pauer, 68, Austrian jazz pianist and composer.
- 25 July: Franz West, 65, Austrian artist, liver disease.
- 28 July: Sepp Mayerl, 75, Austrian mountaineer, climbing incident.
- 4 October: Rudolf Oslansky, 81, Austrian footballer (Wiener Sport-Club).
- 9 October: Luna Alcalay, 83, Austrian pianist, music educator and composer.
- 10 October: Ilse Maria Aschner, 94, Austrian journalist.
- 19 October: Johann Kniewasser, 61, Austrian alpine skier, liver disease.
- 28 October: Björn Sieber, 23, Austrian alpine skier, traffic collision.
- 15 November: Josef Kloimstein, 84, Austrian Olympic silver (1960) and bronze (1956) medal-winning rower.
- 27 November: Herbert Oberhofer, 57, Austrian footballer (Admira Wacker).
- 25 December: Othmar Schneider, 84, Austrian Olympic champion (1952) Alpine skier and marksman.
