= 2016 in Austria =

- Decades: 1990s; 2000s; 2010s; 2020s
- See also: Other events of 2016; List of years in Austria

== Incumbents ==
- President: Heinz Fischer (until 9 July), Alexander Van der Bellen (starting 9 July)
- Chancellor: Werner Faymann (until 9 May); Christian Kern (from 17 May)

=== Governors ===
- Burgenland: Hans Niessl
- Carinthia: Peter Kaiser
- Lower Austria: Erwin Pröll
- Salzburg: Wilfried Haslauer Jr.
- Styria: Hermann Schützenhöfer
- Tyrol: Günther Platter
- Upper Austria: Josef Pühringer
- Vienna: Michael Häupl
- Vorarlberg: Markus Wallner

== Events ==
=== August ===
- 5 August – Austria sends 68 athletes to compete at the 2016 Summer Olympics in Rio de Janeiro, Brazil.
