= 2014 in Austria =

- Decades: 1990s; 2000s; 2010s; 2020s
- See also: Other events of 2014; List of years in Austria

The following lists events that happened during 2014 in the Republic of Austria.

== Incumbents ==
- President: Heinz Fischer
- Chancellor: Werner Faymann

=== Governors ===
- Burgenland: Hans Niessl
- Carinthia: Peter Kaiser
- Lower Austria: Erwin Pröll
- Salzburg: Wilfried Haslauer Jr.
- Styria: Franz Voves
- Tyrol: Günther Platter
- Upper Austria: Josef Pühringer
- Vienna: Michael Häupl
- Vorarlberg: Markus Wallner

== Events ==
=== May ===
- May 10 - Rise Like a Phoenix by Austrian singer Conchita Wurst wins the Eurovision Song Contest 2014.
- May 25 - European Parliament election, 2014

=== July ===
- July 23 - A football friendly in Austria between Israeli Maccabi Haifa F.C. and French team Lille OSC is abandoned after pro-Palestinian protesters storm the field and attack the players.

=== August ===
- August 26 - Michael Spindelegger resigns as vice-chancellor and finance minister of Austria; as leader of the Austrian People's Party, he is replaced by Reinhold Mitterlehner.

== Sport ==
- 2013–14 Austrian Football Bundesliga
- 2013–14 Austrian Football First League
- 2013–14 Austrian Cup
- 2013–14 Austrian Hockey League season
- Austria at the 2014 Winter Olympics
