= 2019 in Austria =

- Decades: 1990s; 2000s; 2010s; 2020s
- See also: Other events of 2019; List of years in Austria

Events from the year 2019 in Austria.

== Incumbents ==
- President: Alexander Van der Bellen
- Chancellor: Sebastian Kurz (until 28 May), Brigitte Bierlein (from 3 June)

=== Governors ===
- Burgenland: Hans Niessl (until 28 February); Hans Peter Doskozil (from 28 February)
- Carinthia: Peter Kaiser
- Lower Austria: Johanna Mikl-Leitner
- Salzburg: Wilfried Haslauer Jr.
- Styria: Hermann Schützenhöfer
- Tyrol: Günther Platter
- Upper Austria: Thomas Stelzer
- Vienna: Michael Ludwig
- Vorarlberg: Markus Wallner

== Events ==
- 1 January – Same-sex marriage becomes legal in Austria.
- 18 May – Vice chancellor and FPÖ leader Heinz-Christian Strache announces his resignation following the Ibiza affair, he and all of the other FPÖ cabinet members left the government 4 days later. This left the Kurz government as a ÖVP minority government.
- 28 May – The First Kurz government is dismissed after losing a motion of no confidence.
- 3 June – President Van der Bellen appointed former president of Constitutional Court Brigitte Bierlein as the first independent chancellor after WWII, as well as the first female to hold the office. She and her technocratic cabinet are expected to leave their positions when a new government is formed after the legislative election to be held in late September.
- 1 November – Austria becomes one of the last European countries to ban smoking in bars and restaurants, after years of debate.

== Sports ==
- 20 February–3 March: The FIS Nordic World Ski Championships are held at Seefeld in Tirol.

== Deaths ==
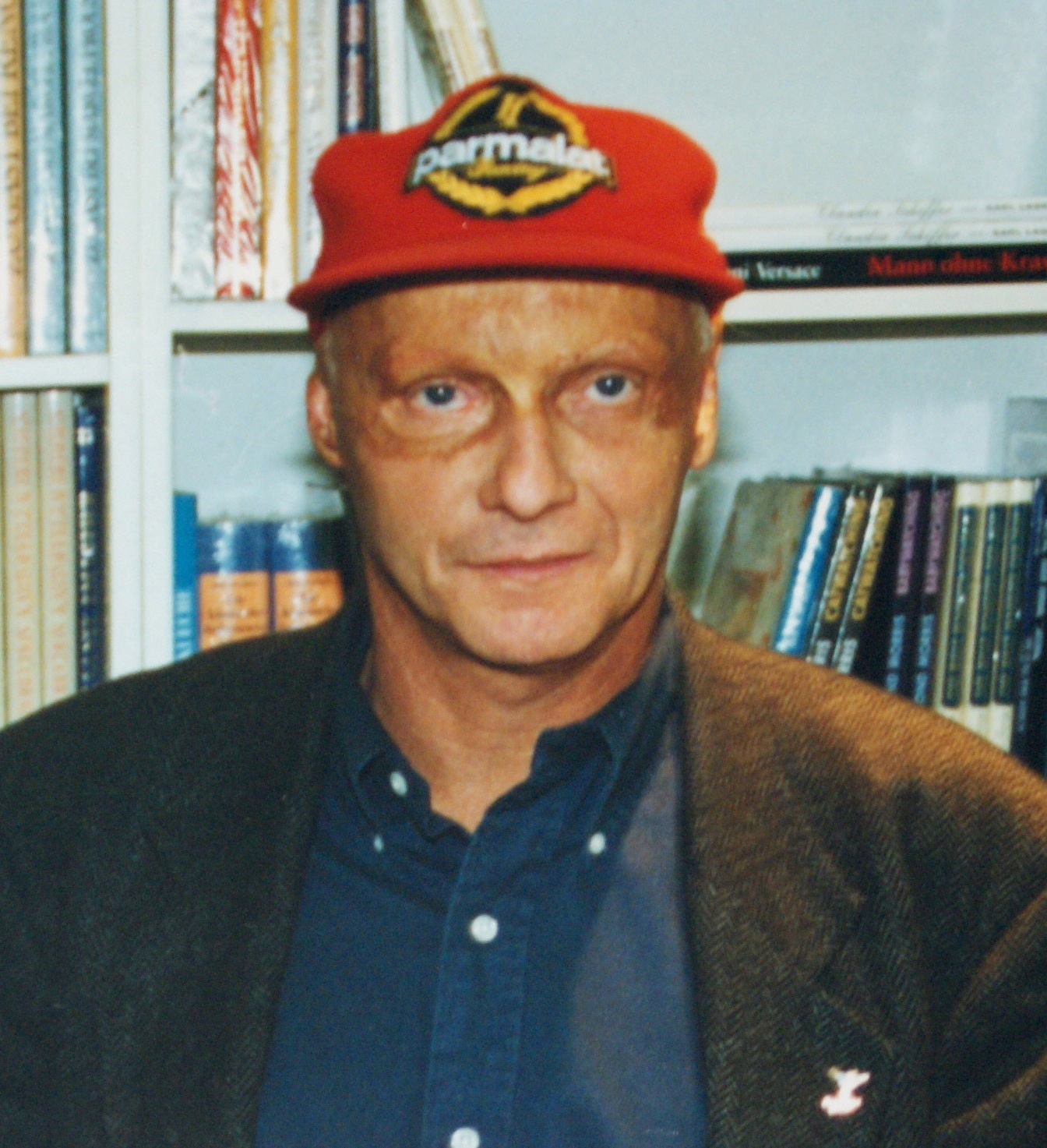
Niki Lauda

- 27 January – Wilma Lipp, operatic soprano, 93
- 8 March – Michael Gielen, orchestral conductor, 91
- 16 April – Jörg Demus, pianist, 90
- 20 May – Niki Lauda, racing driver and airline owner, Formula One world champion (1975, 1977, 1984), 70
- 14 June – Martin Roth, artist, 41

== See also ==
- 2019 European Parliament election
