= 2020 in Austria =

- Decades: 2000s; 2010s; 2020s
- See also: Other events of 2020; List of years in Austria

Events in the year 2020 in Austria.

== Incumbents ==
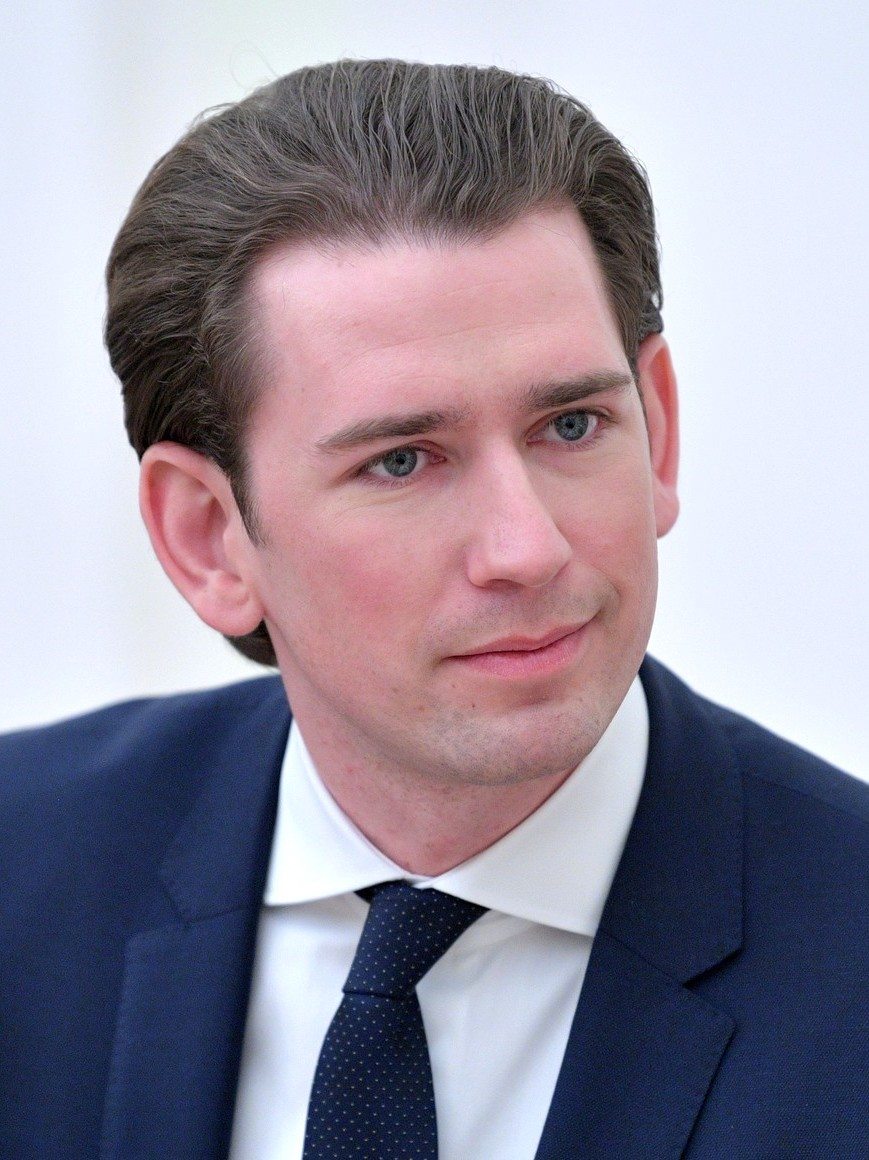
Sebastian Kurz, new chancellor from 7 January

- President: Alexander Van der Bellen
- Chancellor: Brigitte Bierlein (until 7 January); Sebastian Kurz (from 7 January)

=== Governors ===
- Burgenland: Hans Peter Doskozil
- Carinthia: Peter Kaiser
- Lower Austria: Johanna Mikl-Leitner
- Salzburg: Wilfried Haslauer Jr.
- Styria: Hermann Schützenhöfer
- Tyrol: Günther Platter
- Upper Austria: Thomas Stelzer
- Vienna: Michael Ludwig
- Vorarlberg: Markus Wallner

== Events ==
- 7 January – Sebastian Kurz takes over as Chancellor of Austria, replacing Brigitte Bierlein
- 9 – 26 January – The 2020 European Men's Handball Championship is hosted by Austria, Norway and Sweden.
- 20 – 26 January – The 2020 European Figure Skating Championships is held in Graz.
- 15 May – Ulrike Lunacek resigns as Austrian minister of culture, following criticism of her actions with respect to the Austrian cultural economy in the wake of the COVID-19 pandemic.

== Deaths ==
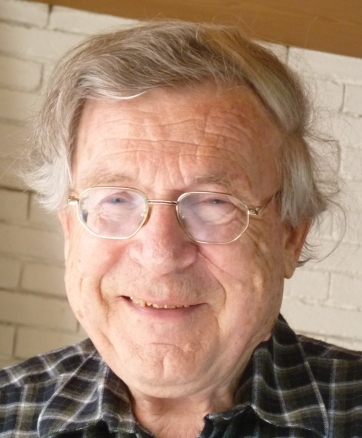
Wolfgang Brezinka

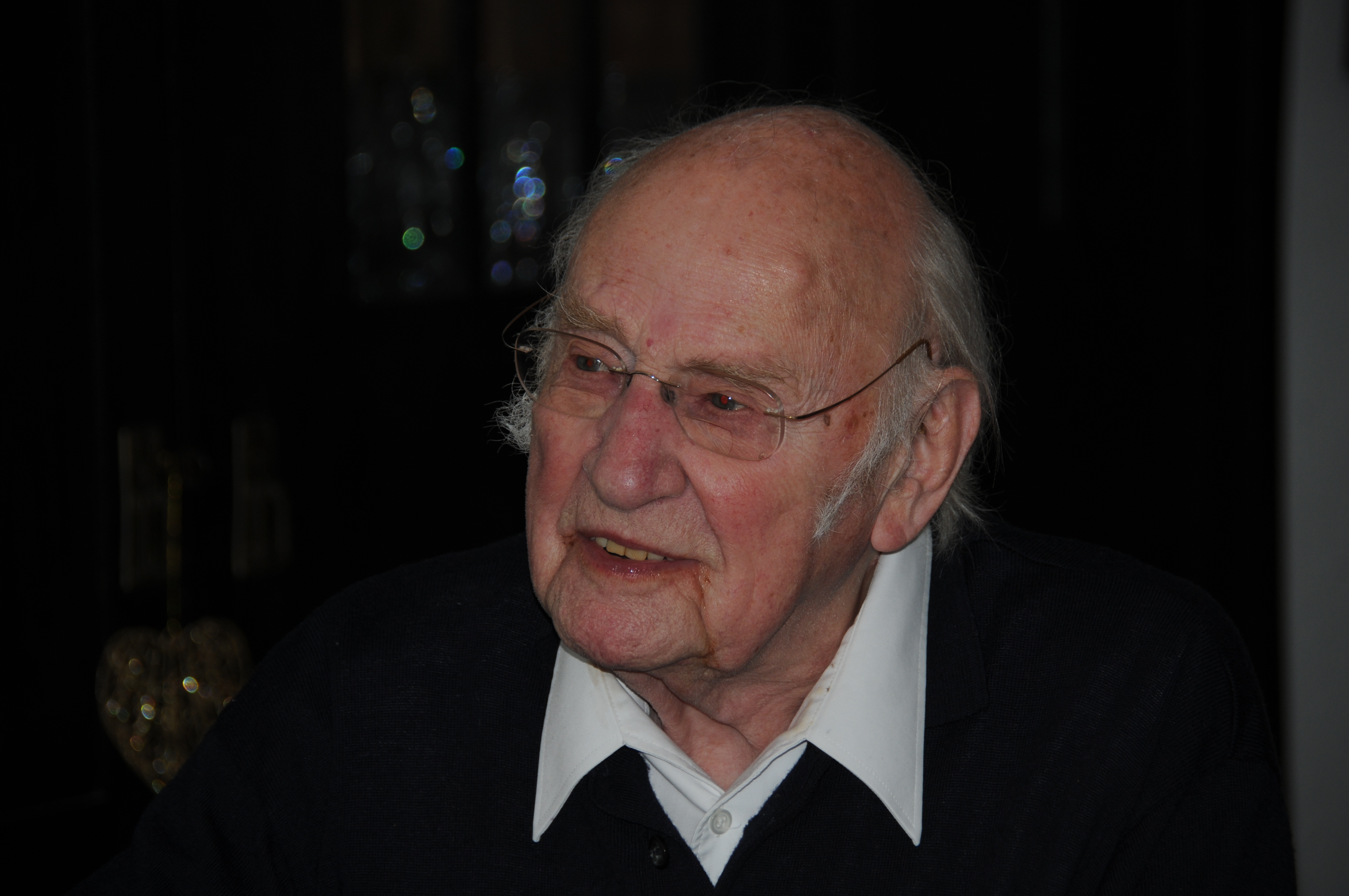
Franz Mazura

- 3 January – Wolfgang Brezinka, educational scientist (b. 1928).
- 17 January – Oswald Oberhuber, sculptor and painter (b. 1931).
- 19 January – Manfred Clynes, Austrian-born Australian-American scientist, inventor and musician (b. 1925).
- 21 January – Theodor Wagner, footballer (b. 1927).
- 23 January
  - Adolf Holl, theologian (b. 1930).
  - Alfred Körner, footballer (b. 1926).
  - Franz Mazura, operatic bass-baritone (b. 1924)
- 7 February – Paul Koralek, Austrian-born British architect (b. 1933).
- 15 February – Wilfried Thaler, cyclist (b. 1934)
- 28 March – Hertha Töpper, contralto (b. 1924)
- 6 May – Norbert Balatsch, singer and choral conductor (b. 1928)
- 24 August – Frederick Baker, filmmaker and archaeologist (b. 1965).
- 6 December – Klaus Ofczarek, operatic tenor and actor (b. 1939)
