= 2017 in Austria =

- Decades: 1990s; 2000s; 2010s; 2020s
- See also: Other events of 2017; List of years in Austria

Events from the year 2017 in Austria.

== Incumbents ==
- President: Alexander Van der Bellen
- Chancellor: Christian Kern (until 18 December), Sebastian Kurz (since 18 December)

=== Governors ===
- Burgenland: Hans Niessl
- Carinthia: Peter Kaiser
- Lower Austria: Erwin Pröll (until 19 April); Johanna Mikl-Leitner (from 19 April)
- Salzburg: Wilfried Haslauer Jr.
- Styria: Hermann Schützenhöfer
- Tyrol: Günther Platter
- Upper Austria: Josef Pühringer (until 5 April); Thomas Stelzer (from 5 April)
- Vienna: Michael Häupl
- Vorarlberg: Markus Wallner

== Events ==
- 1 January – The Law against social and wage dumping came into effect.
- 18 March to 26 March – The 2017 Special Olympics World Winter Games are held in Graz and Schladming, Austria.
- 2 July to 6 July – The 2017 Tour of Austria is held.
- 9 July – The 2017 Austrian Grand Prix is held.
- October – a legal ban on face-covering Islamic clothing was adopted by the Austrian parliament.
- 15 October – Austrian legislative election, 2017
- 18 December – The First Kurz government is formed.

== Deaths ==
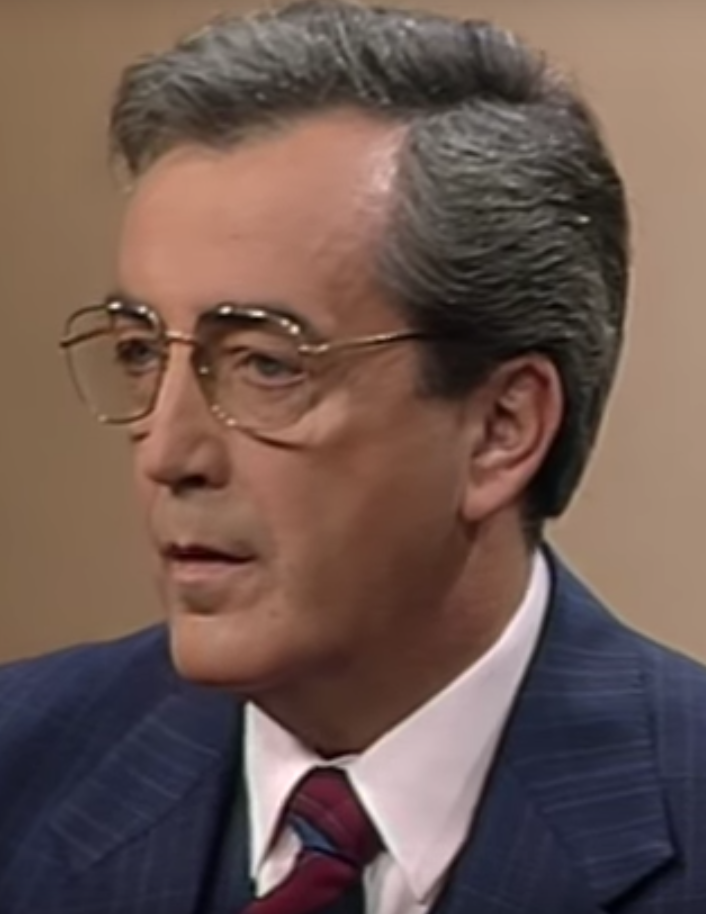
Alois Mock

- 15 January – Erwin Obermair, amateur astronomer (b. 1946).
- 23 February - Sabine Oberhauser, politician (b. 1963).
- 1 June – Alois Mock, politician (b. 1934)
