= 2015 in Austria =

- Decades: 1990s; 2000s; 2010s; 2020s
- See also: Other events of 2015; List of years in Austria

The following lists events that happened during 2015 in the Republic of Austria.

== Incumbents ==
- President: Heinz Fischer
- Chancellor: Werner Faymann

=== Governors ===
- Burgenland: Hans Niessl
- Carinthia: Peter Kaiser
- Lower Austria: Erwin Pröll
- Salzburg: Wilfried Haslauer Jr.
- Styria: Franz Voves (until 16 June); Hermann Schützenhöfer (from 16 June)
- Tyrol: Günther Platter
- Upper Austria: Josef Pühringer
- Vienna: Michael Häupl
- Vorarlberg: Markus Wallner

== Events ==
=== January ===
- January 5 - An avalanche near the Rettenbach glacier in the Austrian Alps, kills two prospects for the United States ski team, Ronnie Berlack and Bryce Astle.

=== February ===
- February 25 - The Austrian Parliament passes a bill, partly aimed at tackling Islamist radicalism, that gives Muslims more legal security but bans foreign funding for mosques and imams.

=== May ===
- May 19 - Austria held the 60th Eurovision Song Contest in Vienna between 19 and 23 May.

Sweden won.

=== August ===
- August 27 - Burgenland corpses discovery: the bodies of 71 illegal immigrants were discovered in a lorry on the Ost Autobahn in Burgenland

=== November ===
- Samra Kesinovic, an Austrian teenager who traveled to Syria to join the Islamic State of Iraq and the Levant, is reported dead, having been beaten to death by the group after trying to escape from Raqqa. Her companion, Sabina Selimovic, was reported to have been killed in fighting in Syria in September 2014.

=== December ===
- December 2 - Vienna swimming pool rape
- December 5 - Miss Earth 2015 took place on December 5, 2015, at Marx Halle, Vienna, Austria. Jamie Herrell of the Philippines will crown her successor at the end of the event.

== Deaths ==
- June 22 - Irma Schwager, Second World War resistance fighter and communist politician (b. 1920)
