= 2013 in Austria =

- Decades: 1990s; 2000s; 2010s; 2020s
- See also: Other events of 2013; List of years in Austria

== Incumbents ==
- President: Heinz Fischer
- Chancellor: Werner Faymann

=== Governors ===
- Burgenland: Hans Niessl
- Carinthia: Gerhard Dörfler (until 28 March); Peter Kaiser (from 28 March)
- Lower Austria: Erwin Pröll
- Salzburg: Gabi Burgstaller (until 19 June); Wilfried Haslauer Jr. (from 19 June)
- Styria: Franz Voves
- Tyrol: Günther Platter
- Upper Austria: Josef Pühringer
- Vienna: Michael Häupl
- Vorarlberg: Markus Wallner

== Events ==
- 21 January - Two Vienna S-Bahn trains packed with morning commuters collide on a single-track stretch of line between Hütteldorf and Penzing in Vienna's suburbs in eastern Austria, leaving 41 people injured, five of them seriously. Among the injured is the driver of one of the trains. Both trains were operating the Line S45 service, and both trains were made up of 4024-series rolling stock.

== Deaths ==
- 7 May: Peter Rauhofer, DJ, remixer and record producer, 48
- 26 May: Otto Muehl, artist, 87
