= Günter Vetter =

Austrian stonemason and politician (1936–2022)

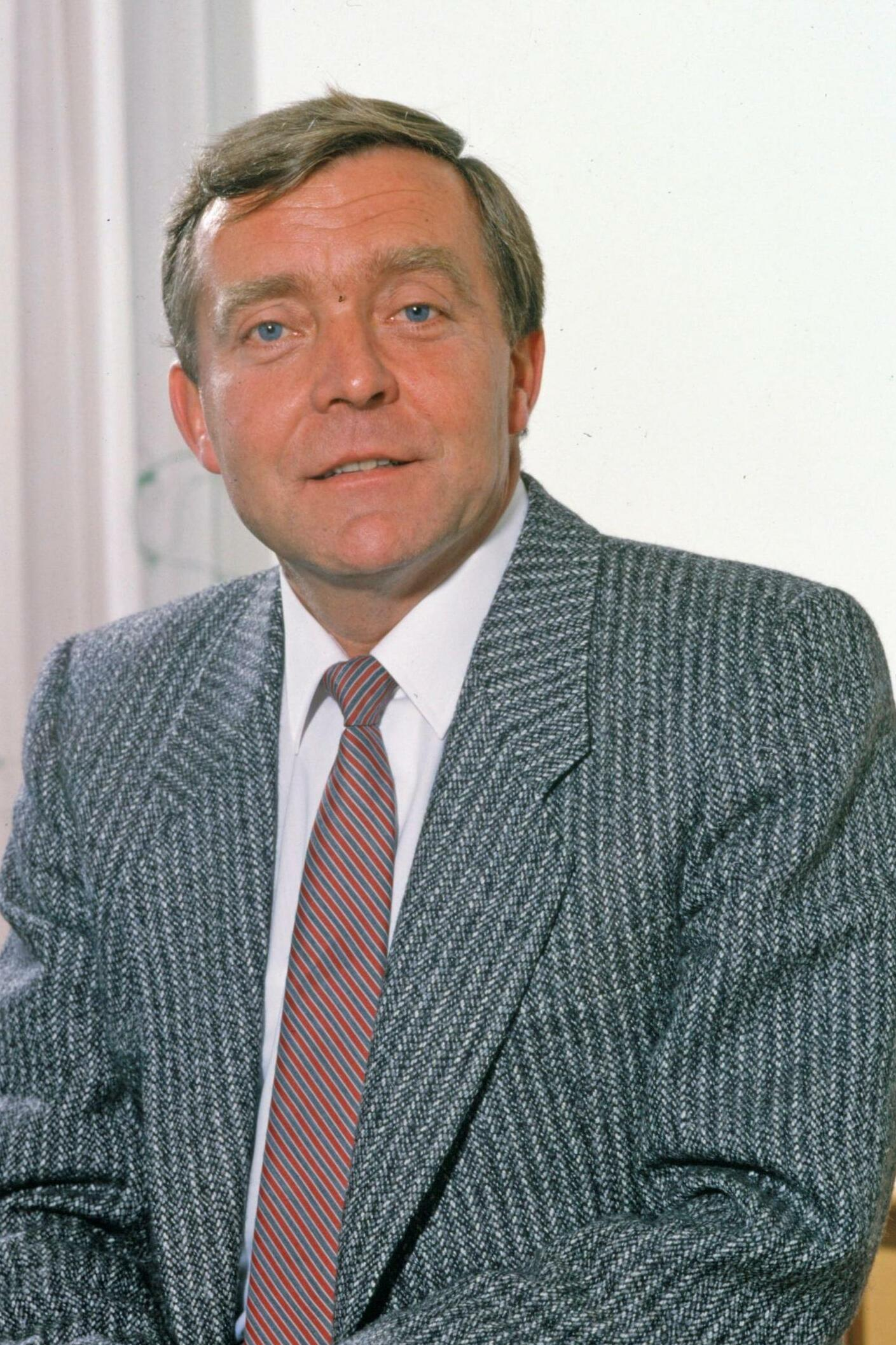

Vorarlberg State Councilor for Trade, Road Construction, Building Construction, and Tourism
- In office 6 November 1984 – 24 October 1989
- Governor: Herbert Kessler; Martin Purtscher

Member of the Dornbirn City Council
- In office 1965–1980

Personal details
- Born: 4 July 1936 Dornbirn, Vorarlberg, Austria
- Died: 6 October 2022 (aged 86)
- Party: Austrian People's Party
- Spouse: Inge Stembal (m. 1968)
- Children: 2
- Education: Federal College for Stone Technology

Günter Vetter (4 July 1936 – 6 October 2022) was an Austrian stonemason and politician who served as the Vorarlberg state councilor for Trade, Road Construction, Building Construction, and Tourism from 1984 until 1989. A member of the Austrian People's Party, Vetter had previously served on the Dornbirn City Council from 1965 until 1980.

== Biography ==
=== Early life and education ===
Günter Vetter was born on 4 July 1936 in the city of Dornbirn, Vorarlberg. He attended the Federal Gymnasium Dornbirn, and later graduated from the trade school in Lustenau. In 1952, Vetter became an apprentice stonemason at his family's stonemasonry company, Stein Vetter GmbH, and he passed the journeyman examination in 1955. In 1958, Vetter began attending the Federal College for Stone Technology in Hallein, and he passed the master stonemason examination in 1960.

=== Professional career ===
After becoming a master stonemason, Vetter began working at Stein Vetter GmbH. In 1962, Vetter took ownership of the company, managing it until 1997. Vetter served as the deputy guild master of the Vorarlberg Stonemasons Guild from 1964 until 1967, and served as guild master from 1968 until 1993. During the latter time period, Vetter also served as a member of the Federal Guild Committee of Stonemasons, and from 1975 until 1980, he served as deputy guild master.

Vetter also served as a member of several boards. From 1972 until 1984, he served as a board member of the Vorarlberg Regional Health Insurance Fund, serving as its deputy chairman from 1975 until 1984. He also served as a member of the Dornbirn district school council committee from 1977 to 1984. From 1983 until 1990, he served on the supervisory board for the Dornbirner Messegesellschaft, and from 1987 to 1995, he served on the supervisory board for the Arlberg Road Tunnel. From 1989 until 1996, Vetter was the chairman of the trade division of the Vorarlberg Chamber of Commerce, where he was "responsible for public relations and budget policy".

Vetter served as a sworn expert on stonemasonry from 1975 until 2008.

=== Political career ===
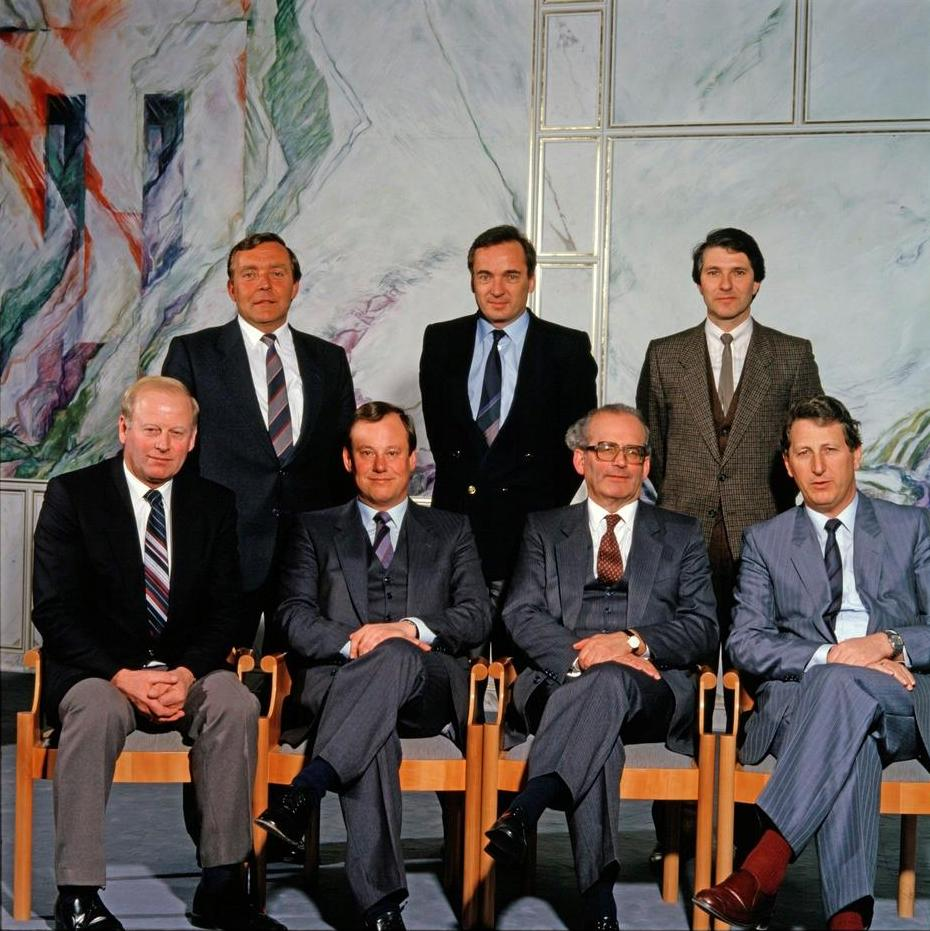
Vetter (top left) with the Kessler cabinet in 1985.

Vetter had been a member of the Austrian People's Party since 1956. In 1965, he was elected as a substitute member of the Dornbirn City Council, and was elected a full member in 1972. Vetter served on the city council until 1980. While on the city council, Vetter was a member of the Construction, School, and Road Committee.

On 6 November 1984, Vetter was appointed to the Voralberg State Government by Herbert Kessler, the governor of Vorarlberg, to serve as state councilor for Trade, Road Construction, Building Construction, and Tourism. During his tenure as state councilor, Vetter helped develop the state's energy policy, and he convinced several companies to invest in air pollution control systems. He was also responsible for Vorarlberg's transportation policy, introducing a half-price pass for transit and a bus excursion ticket to the forest. During Vetter's tenure, the Vorarlberg Technology Transfer Center and the Vorarlberg Energy Saving Association were also founded. Vetter was retained as state councilor following the ascension of Martin Purtscher to the governorship. Vetter resigned from the state government on 24 October 1989, at the end of the legislative session. From 1984 until 1989, Vetter also served on the executive committee for the Vorarlberg branch of the Austrian People's Party.

=== Family and death ===
Vetter married Inge Stembal in 1968, and they had two daughters. Vetter died on 6 October 2022, at the age of 86. Following his death, state governor Markus Wallner praised Vetter for his contributions to the infrastructure of Vorarlberg, stating that Vetter "had the often unrewarded task of state road construction officer. In this function, his conciliatory nature, his willingness to talk to all citizens and his flexibility in planning issues have proven particularly valuable".

== Awards and honors ==
- Awarded the title Commercial Counselor (1991)
- Gold Medal of Honor of the Federal Guild of Stonemasons (1992)
