= Gelbard =

Gelbard is a surname. Notable people with the surname include:

- José Ber Gelbard (1917–1977), Argentine activist
- Robert S. Gelbard (born 1944), American diplomat
- Rudolf Gelbard (1930–2018), Austrian campaigner and Holocaust survivor

== See also ==
- Gelbart
