= Thüringen (disambiguation) =

Thüringen, or Thuringia, is a state of Germany.

Thüringen may also refer to:

- Thüringen, Austria, a municipality in the district of Bludenz
- SMS Thüringen, a dreadnought battleship of the Imperial German Navy
- Elizabeth of Hungary (German: Elisabeth von Thüringen) (1207–1231), Hungarian princess, landgravine of Thuringia and saint
