= Manfred Rein =

Austrian politician (1948–2016)

Manfred Rein (19 December 1948, in Dornbirn, Austria – 22 April 2016, in Feldkirch, Austria) was an Austrian politician for the Austrian People's Party (ÖVP) and president of the Economic Chamber of Vorarlberg.

== Life ==
After completing grammar school in his hometown of Dornbirn, Rein went to the Handelsschule in Feldkirch. Subsequently, he completed studying as a tiler, which he completed in 1971. In 1976, he passed the master's examination for plate tiler and in 1980 founded his own company in Dornbirn.

He was married and lived with his wife as well as a son and a daughter in Dornbirn.

== Politics ==
From 1980 to 1994, Rein was a member of the Dornbirn City Council for the Austrian People's Party. From 1985 to 1994, he was also city councilor in Dornbirn. From 1995 until the end of 2008, he worked as a provincial councilor in the Vorarlberg state government. He was responsible for the areas of general economic affairs (economic and transport policy), economic law (business and water law), spatial planning and construction law, housing promotion, and traffic law and road construction.

On 20 November 2008, Rein was appointed by the General Assembly of the Vorarlberg branch of the Austrian Federal Economic Chamber as the successor of the President of the Federal Economic Chamber, Kuno Riedmann. His successor as provincial councilor in the state government became Karlheinz Rüdisser. At the Landtag meeting on 10 December 2008, Rein resigned from office as provincial councilor and on the following day took his new position as President of the Federal Economic Chamber. He held this office until his death in 2016. He also served as chairman of the Vorarlberg branch of the ÖVP sub-organization Österreichische Wirtschaftsbund.
