= Karlheinz Rüdisser =

Austrian politician (born 1955)

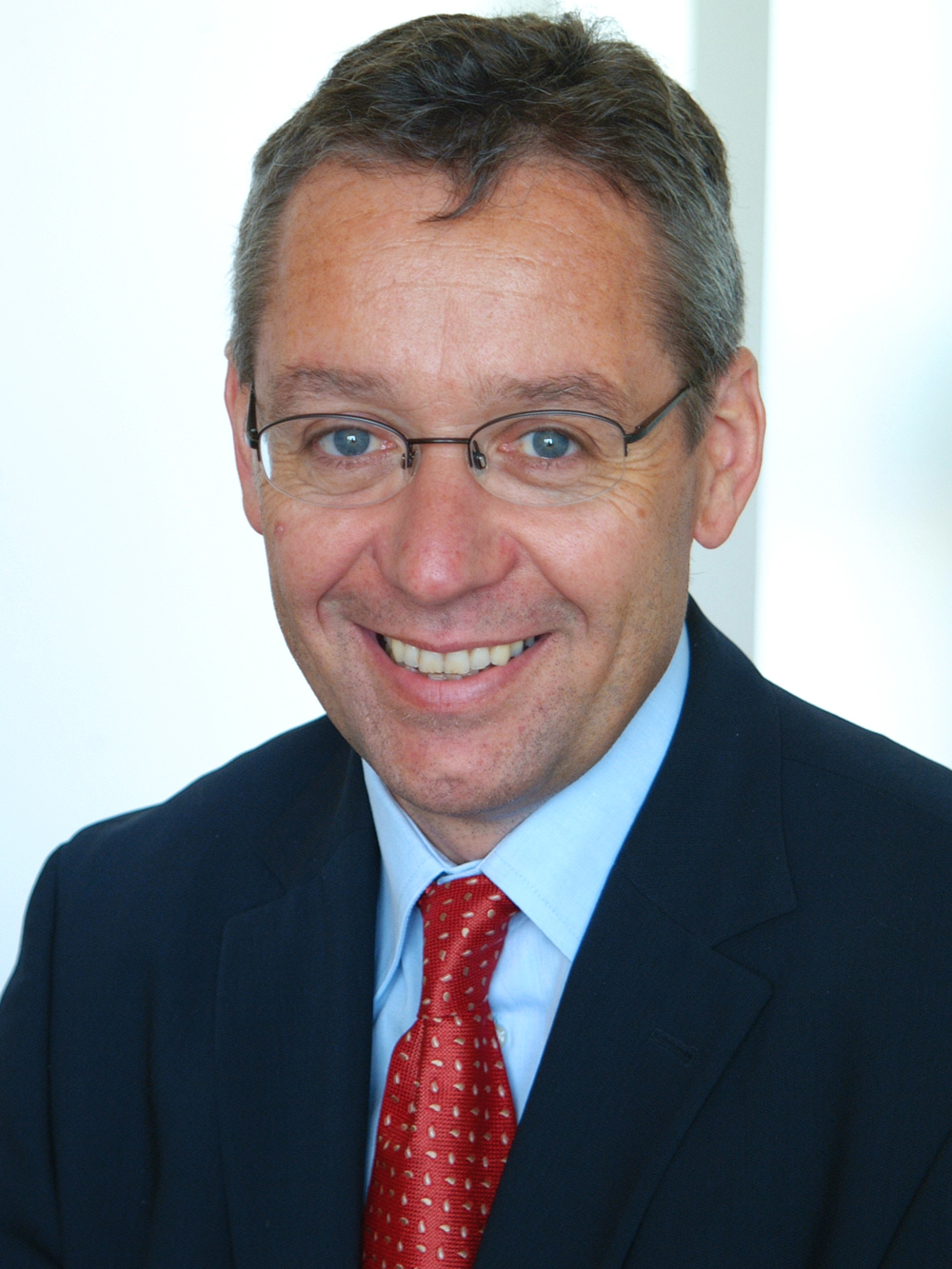
Karlheinz Rüdisser

Karlheinz Rüdisser (born 25 February 1955, Bregenz, Austria) is an Austrian politician for the Austrian People's Party (ÖVP), who, since December 2011, is the state administrator of Vorarlberg.

He is married and lives with his wife and a daughter and two sons in Lauterach.

== Education ==
After secondary school, Rüdisser studied at the commercial academy at Bregenz, where he graduated in 1974, and he studied international business at the Vienna University of Economics. He graduated with a master's degree in 1980. In the same year, he joined the Vorarlberg Provincial Administration and worked in the Economic Department of Vorarlberg, which he chaired from 1986 to 2008. From 1980 to 1985, he part-time taught Business Administration at the Kloster Marienberg in Bregenz. Since 1975, he has been a member of the Catholic Fraternity K.Ö.HV Mercuria Vienna in ÖCV.

== Political career ==
Rüdisser was first a municipal representative from 1990 and from 1992 onwards in the municipality of Lauterach. From 1995 to 2008, he was deputy mayor of this municipality. On 10 December 2008, he was appointed as successor to Manfred Rein as part of the Provincial Government of Vorarlberg. In this position he was responsible for departments of general economic affairs - responsible in particular for commercial and water rights, land use planning and construction, housing subsidies, traffic law and road - and economic and transport policy, and business law.

After former governor of Vorarlberg Herbert Sausgruber announced his resignation in 2011, his former deputy, state governor Markus Wallner, in a special session of the Vorarlberg Parliament, was elected on 7 December 2011 for the provincial governor. At the same meeting, Rüdisser became Wallners successor as state administrator.
