= Thüringen, Austria =

Thüringen
- Municipality
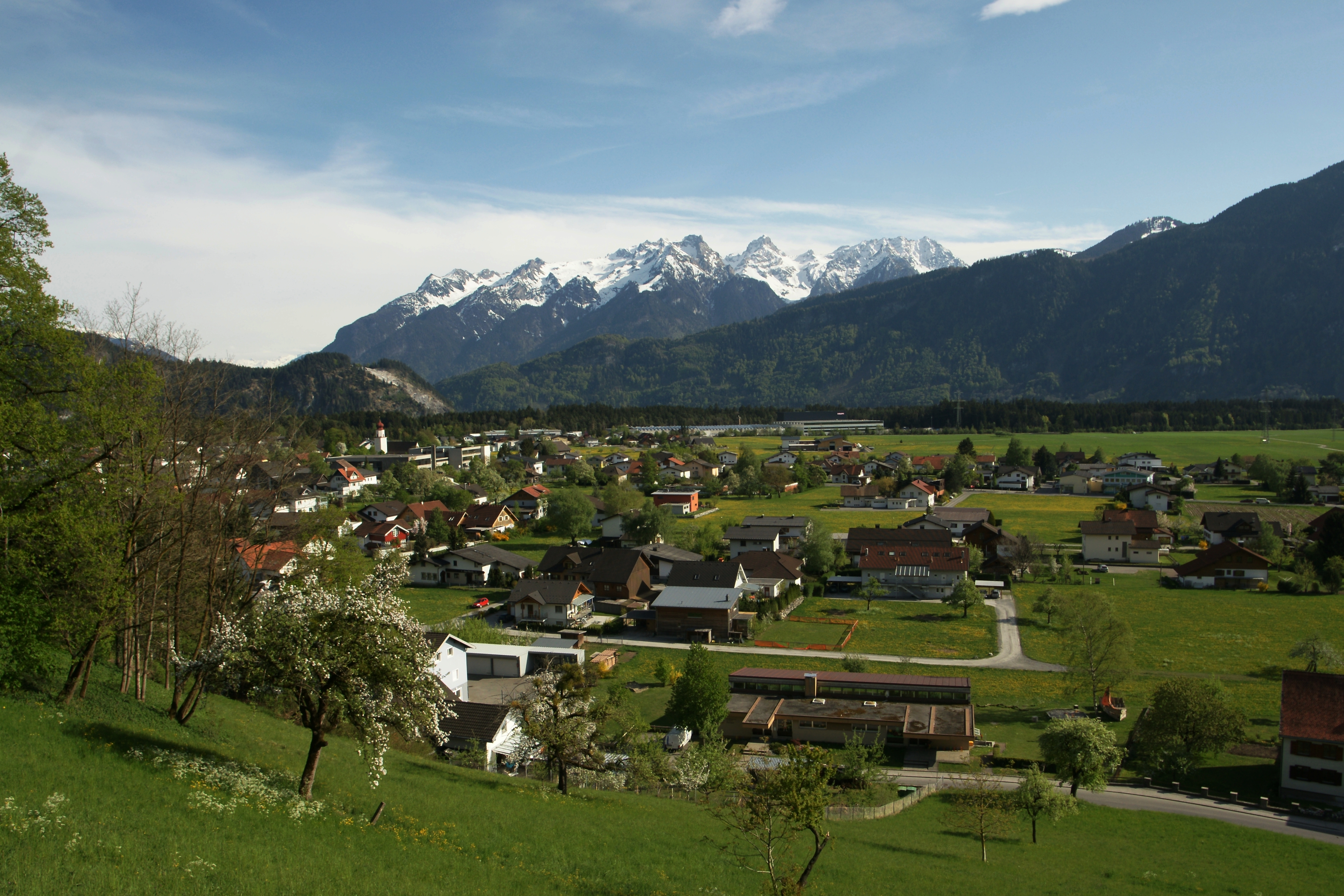

- Coat of arms

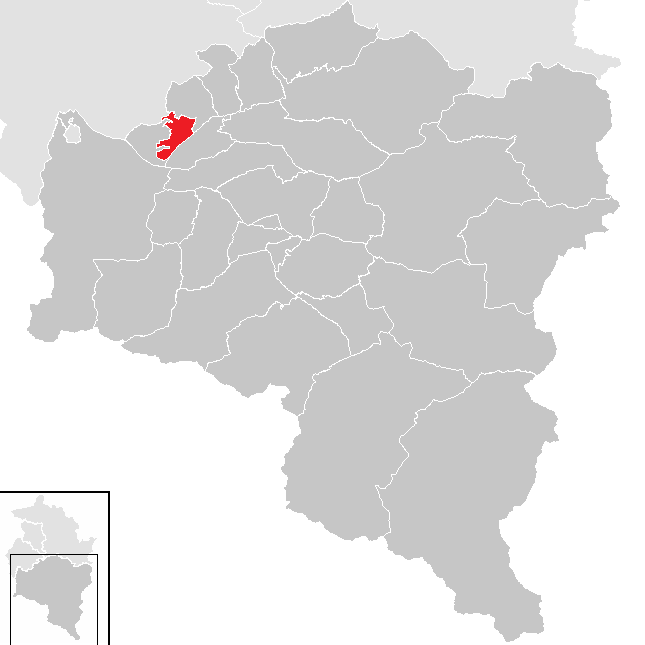
- Location in the district

- Location within Austria
- Coordinates: 47°12′00″N 09°46′00″E
- Country: Austria
- State: Vorarlberg
- District: Bludenz

Government
  - Mayor: Harald Witwer

Area
  - Total: 5.67 km^{2} (2.19 sq mi)
- Elevation: 573 m (1,880 ft)

Population (2018-01-01)
  - Total: 2,222
  - Density: 392/km^{2} (1,010/sq mi)
- Time zone: UTC+1 (CET)
  - Summer (DST): UTC+2 (CEST)
- Postal code: 6712
- Area code: 05550
- Vehicle registration: BZ
- Website: www.thueringen.at

Thüringen is a municipality in the district of Bludenz in the Austrian state of Vorarlberg, near the Walsertal.

== Population ==
Historical population
Year	Pop.	±%
1869	595	—
1880	659	+10.8%
1890	620	−5.9%
1900	687	+10.8%
1910	712	+3.6%
1923	711	−0.1%
1934	820	+15.3%
1939	817	−0.4%
1951	1,029	+25.9%
1961	1,261	+22.5%
1971	1,498	+18.8%
1981	1,691	+12.9%
1991	2,032	+20.2%
2001	2,157	+6.2%
2011	2,151	−0.3%

Thuringen has 2,151 inhabitants.

== Gallery ==
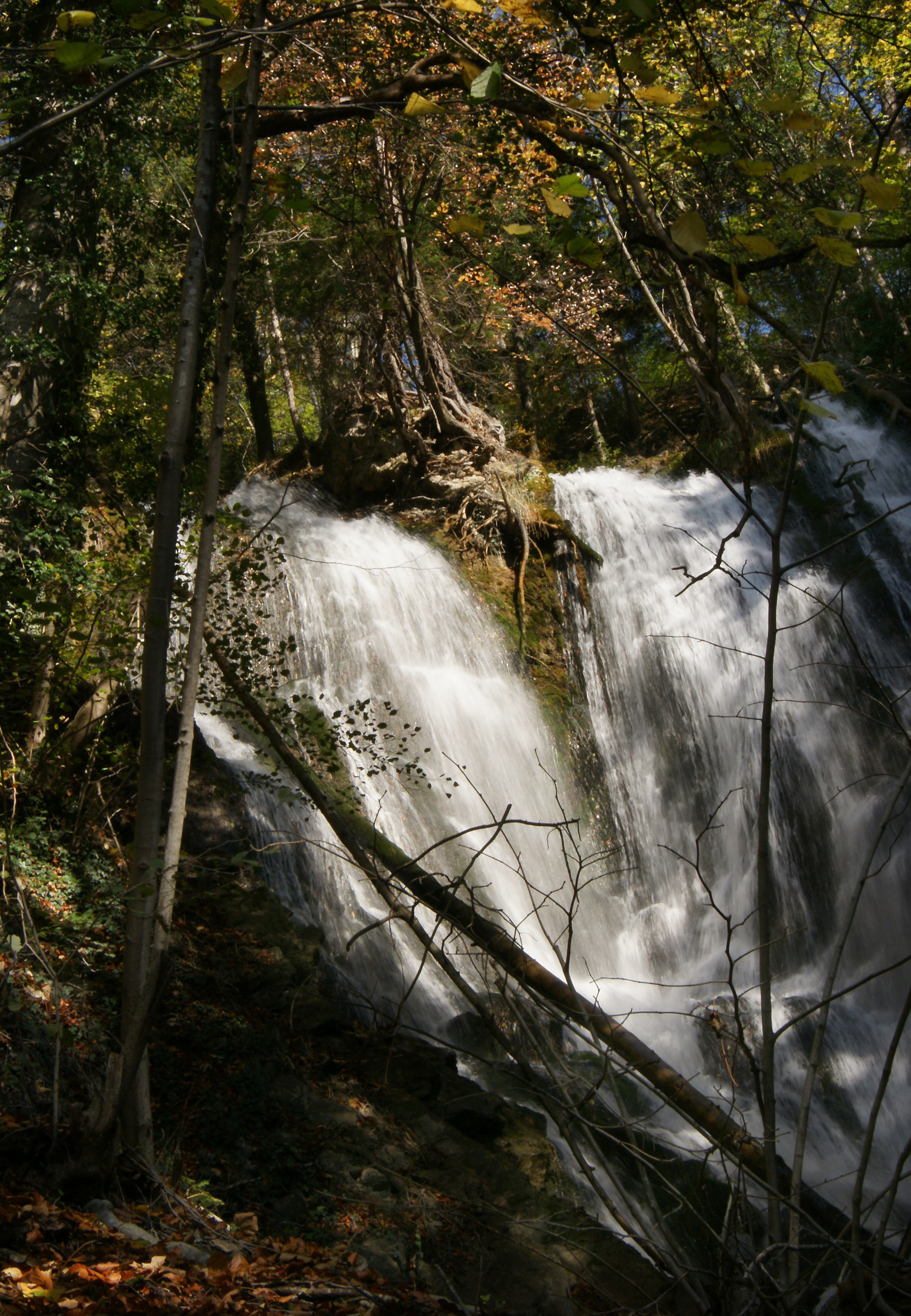
Montjola waterfall

== Personalities ==
- Norman Douglas (1868–1952), Scottish writer
- Kaspar Winkler (1872–1951), manufacturer and inventor
- Martin Purtscher (1928–2023), former Landeshauptmann of Vorarlberg
