= Rudi Bass =

American art director and designer

- Photo of Rudi Bass Self Portrait
- Born: Rudolf Bass; May 22, 1914; Vienna, Austria
- Died: January 6, 2011 (aged 96); New York, New York, USA
- Education: Kunstgewerbeschule
- Known for: Graphic Design
- Notable work: Vidifont, poster art, book illustration and design
- Awards: Emmy Award

Rudolf Bass (May 22, 1914 – January 6, 2011) was a graphic artist, illustrator, and writer. Bass was the art director of the Graphic Arts Department of CBS News during the 1960s, during which time he pioneered the production of a legible typography. He worked in many aspects of print media including posters, books, magazines, before, during and after his work with television, and was the recipient of an EMMY award.

== Early life (1914–1938) ==
Born in Vienna, Austria, Rudi (named Rudolf at birth) was the only child of Friedrich Bass and Auguste Erlich Bass. His father was the chief engineer (Oberingenieur) in Vienna for the railroad, an inventor, and an accomplished pianist; his mother was artistically inclined and an early feminist. He attended Realgymnasium 1 in the Stubenring in Vienna in 1929, where he was immersed in a classical education including languages and math. Upon graduation, Bass was admitted to the Kunstgewerbeschule, now known as The University of Applied Arts, Vienna.

With the help of his American uncle, John Bass, whom he joined when he arrived in New York City, Bass emigrated to the United States in the summer of 1938, for political reasons, having twice been imprisoned for distributing leaflets together with other activists against fascism which had already overtaken Austria, but before Kristallnacht, which occurred in November 1938. Bass was hired by Esquire two weeks after entering the U.S.A. Bass continued working at Esquire until his entry into the U.S. Army in 1943. Bass served during World War II until 1946, during which time he became a U.S. Citizen. Bass’ proclivity in writing extended to poetry as well, and a poem of his entitled, The Heroes was published in "The Best from Yank Army Weekly" (selected by the editors of Yank, published by E. P. Dutton & Co., Inc., New York 1945 p. 153).

== Creative life ==
Later, he was an art director in The New York Times' Promotion Department, followed by employment with McCann Erickson, BBDO, and Columbia Records. In television, he was the first, and to date, the only Director of Graphic Arts for CBS.

While at CBS, he inspired the creation of the Vidifont, the first electronic graphics generator employed in television production. The first font offered by the Vidifont was the CND-36 (CBS News Division) font that Rudi designed for CBS News. Rudi worked with the lead engineer who designed the Vidifont teaching him the basics of graphics design so that he would understand the nuances of the problem he was trying to solve. Within a year of its introduction, the system was widely adopted by the industry. CBS received an EMMY award in recognition of the Vidifont's impact on television production.

In addition, while at CBS, Bass was Director of Graphic Arts for the televised coverage of “Man on the Moon: The Epic Journey of Apollo 11,” July – September 1969.

During his career in the United States, Rudi Bass won several awards, at least 14 in all, including: an Emmy from the National Academy of Television Arts & Sciences; 3 Best of Industry awards from The Direct Mail Association of America (DMAA), predecessor of the present-day Direct Marketing Association; an award for Excellence in Typography from the Art Directors Club (1951) and others from the American Institute of Graphic Arts (AIGA), where his work can be found in their design archives.

Additionally, he was a visiting professor at Yale University's School of Art, Graphics Department (1969–1971), the Rhode Island School of Design, and the Philadelphia College of Art.

== Later life ==
At age 72, in 1986, he and his wife, Dr. Annette Lyons, moved to Paris, France, where he began to write and draw as a free-lance artist. Two published works from this period are How to Talk to a French Crocodile and Comment Parler au Crocodile Americaine.

Bass gifted his design and installation of the war memorial stone plaques in the Cloister area and the design of the wrought iron alms bowl in the entry of the American Cathedral in Paris.

From March 26 to April 21, 2002, he had a one-man show at The National Arts Club in NYC The National Arts Club in New York entitled "How We Got Where We Are: 42 Portraits and Stories by Rudi Bass of marriages and murders, myth and reality of the rights of women and the rites of men." These are portraits with calligraphic text depicting historical figures with a brief bio of each. He primarily used acrylics for the paintings and India ink for the calligraphy. This body of work had two additional showings in different venues and were very well received in their entirety both for their beauty and their interesting and educational data in the text.

During all their years in France and continuing in his studio at home in New York City until shortly before his death, Rudi continued turning out books, other artwork and more (see Published works). He painted, sketched, wrote, designed and created daily and was an inspiration for many much younger than he.

At the time of his death, at the age 96, he was working on a project creating a new alphabet to enhance texting on smartphones.

An oral history of his life was recorded by the Leo Baeck Institute in New York shortly before his death, and they have spoken for his work and manuscripts for their library.

== Published works ==
- April Beker Steinbach, “A Traditional Shofar and an Ordinary Ram”, illustrations by Rudi Bass, printed in Switzerland, 2010 ISBN 978-0-9827219-8-8
- Thomas Hauser, “Mark Twain Remembers”, Barricade Books, New York, 1999 (book jacket design by Rudi Bass)
- "Behind Fanzine", first edition front cover illustration by Rudi Bass, Other World Books, 1985
- Eve Smith, “Where Angels Fear to Trade”, illustrations and book cover by Rudi Bass, The Citadel Press, New York, 1971 ISBN 0-8065-0234-7
- America's Graphic Design Magazine, Jan./Feb. 1972 (Print), Rudi Bass, Type on TV (Type Design and its Precise Dimensions) pp. 48–55, written and illustrated by Rudi Bass
- Visible Language, Vol. V, No. 1, "The Development of Vidifont", Rudi Bass pp. 33–38 The Journal, 1971
- Croton-Cortlandt News, "Happy New Year" text and illustrations by Rudi Bass, December 30, 1970
- The Journal of Typographic Research, Vol.1, No.4, Oct 1967 pp. 357–372. The Development of CBS News 36 (Reprint from the Journal. Research results illustrated and discussed.)
- Warren J. Cox, Hugh Newell Jacobsen, The American Institute of Architects, “A Guide to the Architecture of Washington, D.C", book design by Rudi Bass McGraw-Hill, ISBN 0-07-013285-2 (0-07-013285-2)
- Paul Steiner, “Useless Information; how to know more and more about less and less", cover and illustrations by Rudi Bass, The Citadel Press, New York 1959, Library of Congress catalog no.: 59-11991
- Paul Steiner, “More Useless Information”, cover and illustrations by Rudi Bass, The Citadel Press, New York 1960, Library of Congress catalog no.: 62-17827
- Alan Abel, “Crazy Ads”, illustrations by Rudi Bass, The Citadel Press, New York, 1960
- “20,000 Meiken in a U-Boat” by Kapten Hans Hugo Sokol, drawings by Rudi Bass, Copyright Wilhelm Frick GES. M.B.H., Wien 1938
- Anton Tesarek and Wilhelm Börner, “The Children's Etiquette”, illustrations by Rudi Bass. Vienna, Saturn-Verlag, 1938
- Rudi Bass, How to Talk to a French Crocodile, Opusline Ltd., London, 1994 ISBN 1-899698-01-9
- Rudi Bass, Comment Parler au Crocodile Americane, Opusline Ltd., London 1994 ISBN 1-899698-02-7
- America's Graphic Design Magazine, Jan./Feb. 1972 (Print), Rudi Bass, Type on TV (Type Design and its Precise Dimensions) pp. 48–55, written and illustrated by Rudi Bass
- Visible Language, Vol. V, No. 1, "The Development of Vidifont", Rudi Bass pp. 33–38 The Journal, 1971
- "The Best from Yank the Army Weekly." Published by E. P. Dutton & Co., Inc., New York 1945 p. 153
- Rudi Bass, “The Development of CBS News 36”, The Journal of Typographic Research, 1:No.4, October 1967, 4,357-372.
- Print Special Video Issue, guest editor Robert de Havilland, contributor, Rudi Bass, NY RC Publication, 1972
- Jack Sonenberg, “Artists and writers protest against the war in Viet Nam: Poems” designed and produced by Rudi Bass, Artists & Writers Protest, Inc. New York 1967 LC NUMBER: PS595.V5 A78 PUB ID: 101-734-840
- W.H. Allner, "Posters": Fifty artists and designers analyze their approach, their methods, and their solutions to poster design and poster advertising Reinhold Publishing Corporation, New York, 1952 pp. 14–15 Library of Congress Catalog Card No.: 52-10620
- Frank A. Mercer and Rathbone Holme [Editors]: ART & INDUSTRY. London: The Studio Ltd., 1954. Original edition, Volume 56, Number 336: June 1954
- Erich Rattner, "Zeitbild en Face", Poems Vienna: Krystall-Verlag, 1935, cover drawing and full page illustrations by Rudolf Bass.
- Dan Sorkin “The Blabbermouths” drawings by Rudi Bass, The Citadel Press, New York, 1960
- Hugh Lofting "Die Wundermuschel” Copyright Wilhelm Frick GES. M.B.H., Wien 1938 with drawings by Rudi Bass
- Paul Steiner, "How to Be Offensive to Practically Everybody", cover and illustrations by Rudi Bass, The Citadel Press, New York 1960, Library of Congress catalog no.: 60-12352
- Shula Hirsch "An American Housewife in Israel" jacket design by Rudi Bass, The Citadel Press, New York 1962, Library of Congress catalog no.: 62-17825
- George Panetta "Viva Madison Avenue" cover by Rudi Bass, Harcourt, Brace and Company, New York 1957, Library of Congress catalog no.: 57-6213
- Scott Seldin "Yes, Boss" designed by Rudi Bass. Blythe-Pennington, New York, New York, U.S.A., 1982. ISBN 0943778018 / 0-943778-01-8
- Virginia Woolf "The Common Reader" Cover by Rudi Bass, Harcourt, Brace and Company, New York copyright renewed 1953 by Leonard Woolf HB10
- Virginia Woolf "The Second Common Reader" Cover by Rudi Bass, Harcourt, Brace and Company, New York copyright renewed 1953 by Leonard Woolf HB24
- "A Guide to The Architecture of Washington, D.C." Art Director, Rudi Bass, Washington Metropolitan Chapter of the Institute of Architects, 1965, Library of Congress catalog no.: 65-22758
