= Gelbart =

Gelbart is a surname. Notable people with the surname include:

- Abe Gelbart (1911–1994), Israeli-American mathematician
- Eduard Gelbart (1878–1948), German composer
- Larry Gelbart (1928–2009), American comedy writer
- Mikhl Gelbart (1899–1966), American composer of Yiddish songs
- Stephen Gelbart (born 1946), Israeli-American mathematician
