= Friedrich Rückert (field hockey) =

Austrian field hockey player

Personal information
- Nationality: Austrian
- Born: 7 July 1920
- Died: 5 May 2011 (aged 90)

Sport
- Sport: Field hockey

Friedrich Rückert (7 July 1920 – 5 May 2011) was an Austrian field hockey player. He competed in the men's tournament at the 1948 Summer Olympics.
