= Michael Herzog (ice hockey) =

Austrian ice hockey player

Personal information
- Nationality: Austrian
- Born: 27 February 1952 Zell am See, Austria
- Died: 30 January 2011 (aged 58) Lech am Arlberg, Austria

Sport
- Sport: Ice hockey

Michael Herzog (27 February 1952 – 30 January 2011) was an Austrian ice hockey player. He competed in the men's tournament at the 1976 Winter Olympics.
