= Ilse Maria Aschner =

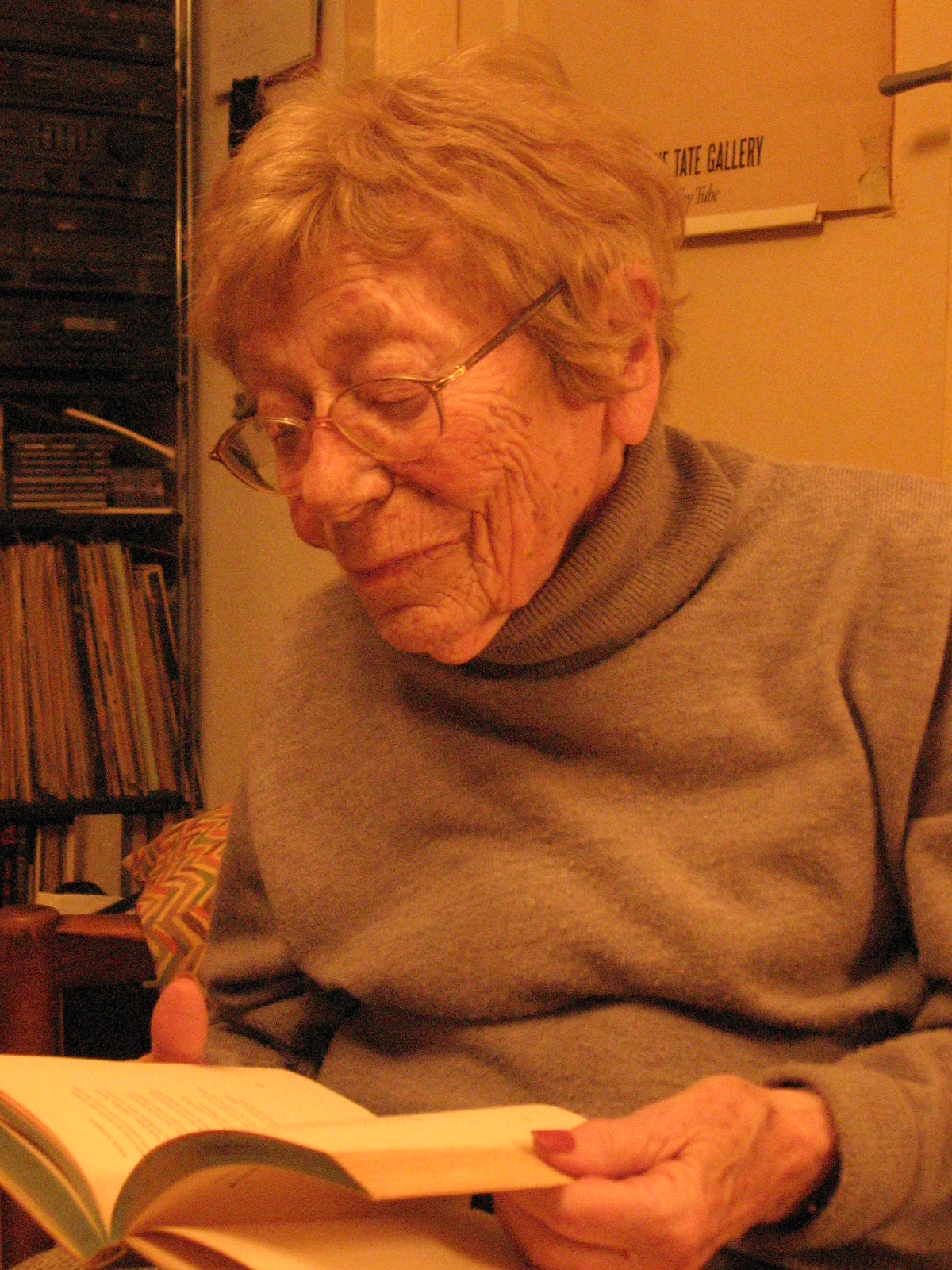
Ilse Maria Aschner

Ilse Maria Aschner, née Römer (September 26, 1918 – October 10, 2012), was an Austrian journalist and survivor of the Holocaust.

== Early life ==
Aschner was born in Vienna, into a secular socialist family with Jewish origins. Her father Gustav Römer was an engineer who served as an officer in the army of the Austrian monarchy during World War I. Aschner's parents were both active members of the Austrian Socialist Party, and raised both Ilse and her brother in humanist ideals. Aschner attended University of Vienna, studying German literature and psychology (including under professor Charlotte Bühler). Until March 1938 she did not know that she was Jewish according to the "Nürnberg Race Laws", passed by the Nazis because she was a baptised Christian though she did not go to church.

== Holocaust ==
In 1938, when the Nazis took power in Austria, Aschner was forced to leave the university. She emigrated in 1939 to Britain, where she worked as a maid in Amotherby a small town in Yorkshire, and later trained in nursing and worked in a kindergarten in Manchester. Her family, except for her brother, who also left Austria, were all killed during the Holocaust. She met her future husband Peter Aschner in the Young Austrian Movement in the early 1940s. He was the son of a textile-factory owner and became a communist during the Second World War.

== Post-war career ==
In 1946 Aschner returned to Austria with her husband, Peter Aschner (1918–1984). She had become a convinced communist and worked for several years as a journalist for the Austrian Communist Party's own newspaper. After the end of the Prague Spring in 1968 Aschner lost her belief in "socialism with a human face", and along with many Austrian intellectuals left the party. From 1969 to 1978 she worked for the Austrian monthly magazine FORVM, which had been founded by Friedrich Torberg and was at that time run by Günther Nenning. After leaving FORVM she became chief secretary of the Grazer Autoren Versammlung, Austria's largest writers' union, where she worked with Ernst Jandl and Josef Haslinger. In 1989 she retired, and has since performed in Vienna's first reading theatre. Since 2006 she has had only a few readings, but remains one of the most interviewed witnesses of the shoah in Austria.

She lived as a widow in Vienna.
