= Julius Depaoli =

Austrian water polo player (1923–2012)

Personal information
- Nationality: Austrian
- Born: 29 March 1923
- Died: 13 March 2012 (aged 88)

Sport
- Sport: Water polo

Julius Depaoli (29 March 1923 – 13 March 2012) was an Austrian water polo player. He competed in the men's tournament at the 1952 Summer Olympics.
