= Konrad Ragossnig =

Austrian musician (1932–2018)

Konrad Ragossnig (6 May 1932 – 3 January 2018) was an Austrian classical guitarist and lutenist.

Ragossnig was born in Klagenfurt, Austria. He taught at City of Basel Music Academy, University of Music and Performing Arts, Vienna and the University of Zurich. He was the editor of several books on guitar music such as "Step by step. Basics of Guitar technique in 60 classical and romantic studies", Mainz 2007 and "Guitar Concert Collection", Mainz 2008.

He died in Antwerp, Belgium.

== Discography ==
- 1964: L'Anthologie de la guitare (Schubert, Mendelssohn, Giuliani, Sor). RCA Victor 430.159.
- 1974: Concertos pour guitare du XVIIIe siècle (Fasch, Krebs, Vivaldi). Vox Musicalis VOX 35050.
- 1973: Music for two Guitars (with Walter Feybli). SAGA 5412.
- 1975: Musik für Laute (6-LP set). Archiv 2723 061. Reissued as:
- 2004 Renaissance Lute Music (4-CD set). Archiv 476 1840.

== Decorations and awards ==
- 1961: First Prize at the Concours International de Guitare in Paris
- 1984: Merit Award of Carinthia
- 1992: Grand Gold Decoration of Carinthia
- 1993: Medal of the city of Vienna
- 1994: Cultural Award of Carinthia
- 1998: Grand Decoration of Honour in Silver for Services to the Republic of Austria
- 2003: Austrian Cross of Honour for Science and Art, 1st class
