= Thomas Pernes =

Thomas Pernes (25 February 1956 – 26 February 2018) was an Austrian avant-garde composer and performance artist who lived and worked in Vienna. He studied piano with Bruno Seidlhofer and composition with Roman Haubenstock-Ramati.

The start of his career in contemporary music was marked by the première of the 1st string quartet at Wiener Konzerthaus in 1976. Already in the early 1980s he had widened the narrow sphere of interest of the classical avant-garde. At a time when the term crossover was not yet known he worked with elements of folk music and jazz just as he used electronics to enlarge the possibilities of composition.

In the 90s he started developing his own form of music theatre, known as Klangtheater: "When Thomas Pernes speaks about sound theater as representation or reproduction of reality, one should think not only superficially of the everyday elements such as sound, fragments of conversation, thought, and quotation that are built into the montage. It is rather and above all the unity that arises paradoxically from disparate and divergent elements and their individual motions that corresponds in its dialectical structure to reality. As Hegel says about reality and truth, so too is the sound theater the Baccahanalisn revel in which no member is not drunk."

Pernes has had performances and commissions at: Donaueschinger Musiktage, ISCM World Music Days in Jerusalem, Daiichiseimei Hall / Tokyo, IRCAM / Paris, Kennedy Center of the Performing Arts / Washington, Pan Music Festival / Seoul, Alte Oper Frankfurt, Europäisches Musikfest Stuttgart, Holland Festival / Amsterdam, Venice Biennale, Musikprotokolle im steirischen herbst, Wiener Staatsoper, Internationales Brucknerfest Linz, Ars Electronica, Wiener Festwochen, Wiener Musikverein amongst others.

He died on 26 February 2018, one day after turning 62.

== Works ==
- Klaviertrio (1971)
- String Quartet No. 1 (1976)
- Reflexionen für Violoncello solo (1976)
- Zyklus für Violine solo: Fragmente, Mobilissimum, Partita, Aria (1977)
- Variations for piano (1978)
- Partita for cello solo (1978)
- Portrait I (1977)
- Portrait II (1979)
- Concerto (1979/80)
- Con Alcune Licenze (1980)
- Hommage à Schubert (1980)
- Gleichsam eine Sinfonie [A kind of symphony] (1980/81)
- Double Concert for Harp and Double Bass (1982)
- Gesänge für neun Instrumente (1982)
- Für ... Bei ... Mit ... (1982)
- Drei Lieder für Bariton und Klavier (1982)
- 1. Klaviersonate (1982/83)
- Zwei Lieder für Bariton solo (1982/83)
- Gaudeamus auf eine Angebetete (1983)
- Violinkonzert (1983)
- Piano solo (1983)
- Alpenglühn: Ballettmusik (1983/84)
- Linz-Musik: Ballettmusik (1984)
- Theseus und Ariadne: Ballettmusik (1984)
- Sonate für Violoncello solo: "... leise verließ am Kreuzweg der Schatten den Fremdling", Georg Trakl (1984/85)
- Rückblende: für Chor, großes Orchester, Soli und Zuspielband (1985)
- Zur Eröffnung (1986)
- Das Herz: Vertonung nach Gedichten von Wolfgang Bauer (1986)
- Voices (1986)
- Herr Faust spielt Roulette: Schauspielmusik zum gleichnamigen Stück von Wolfgang Bauer (1986)
- Klangtheater (1987/88)
- Neue Gesänge aus Klangtheater (1987)
- Trio (1988)
- Two Poems of the Day (1988)
- Grosse Conclusio (1988)
- The End of the World News: Oper nach Anthony Burgess (1989)
- Beginnen (1990)
- 3. Streichquartett (1990)
- Innocent I: Performance (1990)
- What it is (1990)
- Amadeus (1991)
- Part of Voices (1991)
- Innocent II: Performance (1991)
- 2. Klangtheater: Breakaway (1991/92)
- Tänze der Trauer und der Freude (1992)
- Innocent III (1992)
- Songs of an Imaginary Voice (1992)
- Ohne Beirrung (1992/93)
- 4. Streichquartett: "... diese zerbrochene Zeit" (1993/94)
- Perikato / Blackbox I und II: Konzept und Gruppenprojekt mit Karl Ritter (1994/95/98)
- Sonnwende (1995)
- Alpenglühn II (1995)
- Drei Kapitel aus der grossen Erzählung (1995/96)
- Miss Potter hat es sich anders überlegt: Hörspielmusik (1995/96)
- Back to the Roots (1996)
- Revolution Nr. 10: Radio-Experience (1996)
- Das Bild, radiophone Fassung (1997)
- 3. Klangtheater: Das Bild (1997)
- Solo für Violine aus Das Bild (1997)
- Grosse Blasmusik (1998)
- Spielmusik für Violine und präpariertes Klavier (1998)
- Solo für Eckstein (1999)
- Hödlmoser: Opernfragmente (2000)
- Eine Winterreise: für Sopran und Streichquartett (2001/02)
- Der Hirt auf dem Felsen: Orchesterfassung der Konzertarie von Franz Schubert (2002)
- Sea of Rains: Radio-Experience (2002)
- Quartetto Doppio: "Jack in the Box" (2003)
- 4. Klangtheater: Das Fenster zum Paradies (2003/04)
- Perndorff: Gruppenprojekt with Andy Manndorff (2003/04)
- Zauberflöte 06: opera in 3 parts (2004/05)
- HELIOS: für Streichorchester (2005)
- Herrn Johann's Affären: ein kurzer Auszug aus dem Register (2006)
- Aus der Fremde: Musiktheater nach Ernst Jandl (2007/08)

== Discography ==
- String Quartet No. 1 (CD + LP, Pro Viva 1977)
- Piano solo (LP, Teepee 1983)
- Violinkonzert (LP, ORF 1983)
- Linz-Musik (LP, Teepee 1984)
- Alpenglühn (LP, Amadeo 1984)
- Zur Eröffnung (7", Extrasingle 1986)
- Klangtheater (CD, Amadeo 1988)
- 2. Klangtheater: Breakaway (CD, Teepee 1992)
- Sonnwende (CD, Teepee 1995)
- Perikato Blackbox I (CD, Blackbox 1995)
- Für ... Bei ... Mit ... (CD, ORF 1997)
- Perikato Blackbox I und II (CD, Teepee 1998)
- Perndorff (CD, NotTwo 2004)
- 4. Klangtheater: Das Fenster zum Paradies (DVD, Extraplatte 2004)
- Sonnwende – Alpenglühn (CD, Extraplatte 2006)
- Zauberflöte 06 (CD, Extraplatte 2006)
- Streichquartette (CD, Brucknerhaus 2007)
