= Martin Purtscher =

Austrian politician (1928–2023)

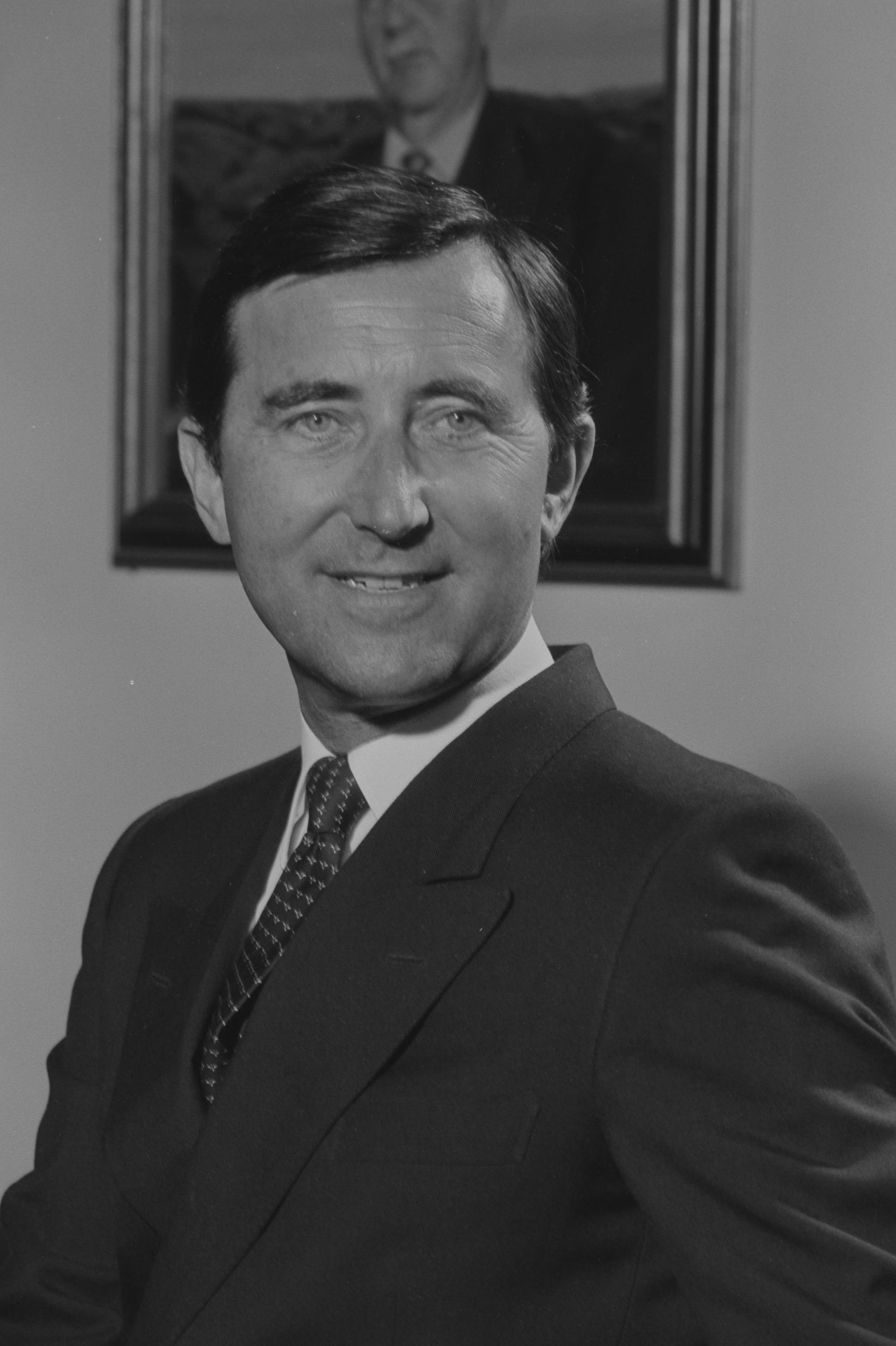
- Purtscher in 1983

Member of the Landtag of Vorarlberg
- In office 29 October 1964 – 31 March 1997
- Constituency: Electoral district Bludenz

Governor of Vorarlberg
- In office 9 July 1987 – 2 April 1997
- Preceded by: Herbert Keßler
- Succeeded by: Herbert Sausgruber

Personal details
- Born: 12 November 1928 Thüringen, Austria
- Died: 27 January 2023 (aged 94)
- Party: ÖVP
- Education: University of Innsbruck

Martin Purtscher (12 November 1928 – 27 January 2023) was an Austrian politician. A member of the Austrian People's Party, he served as Governor of Vorarlberg from 1987 to 1997 and served in the Landtag of Vorarlberg from 1964 to 1997.

Purtscher died on 27 January 2023, at the age of 94.
