= Martin Roth (artist) =

Austrian artist (1977–2019)

Martin Roth (October 2, 1977 – June 14, 2019) was an Austrian artist who lived and worked in New York City, USA.

Roth was born in Graz, and relocated to the US after earning a master's degree from Hunter College in 2011. He was married to Josephine Nash, the director of Mitchell-Innes & Nash gallery. He died in New York City.

== Work ==
Much of Roth's work revolved around the introduction of living organisms into a setting or situation circumscribed by the artist. He used living organisms as a stand in for humans, to show that they're also characters caught in conditions where they don't have control." His work, while frequently ephemeral or temporary, is saturated in space. On one level, there is the physical dimension of spaces large, and small: from the quaint miniature landscapes or rocks and plants inside glass cages, housing lizards or mice to the compact grid of a lavender field shaped by the artist's arrangement in a white cube; from the beautiful patterned garden of Persian rugs sprouting verdant grass, or the tepid lagoon created by flooding a gallery space, to the thrust of a cherry sapling through a laminate surface, demonstrating the interplay between an exposed space above and subterranean space below that characterizes several of Roth's installations. These physical settings often interweave with or generate acoustic spaces to create the conditions for – and are, in turn, shaped by – the natural organism that inhabit them. His work can be large-scale and particular to a site, the fact that it requires the nurture of living organisms renders it strangely intimate and invites the viewer if not to engage directly, at least to consider his or her relationship to the work on a human scale. Roth interrogated the increasingly blurry line between human and nonhuman systems.
