= Hilde Zach =

Austrian politician (1942–2011)

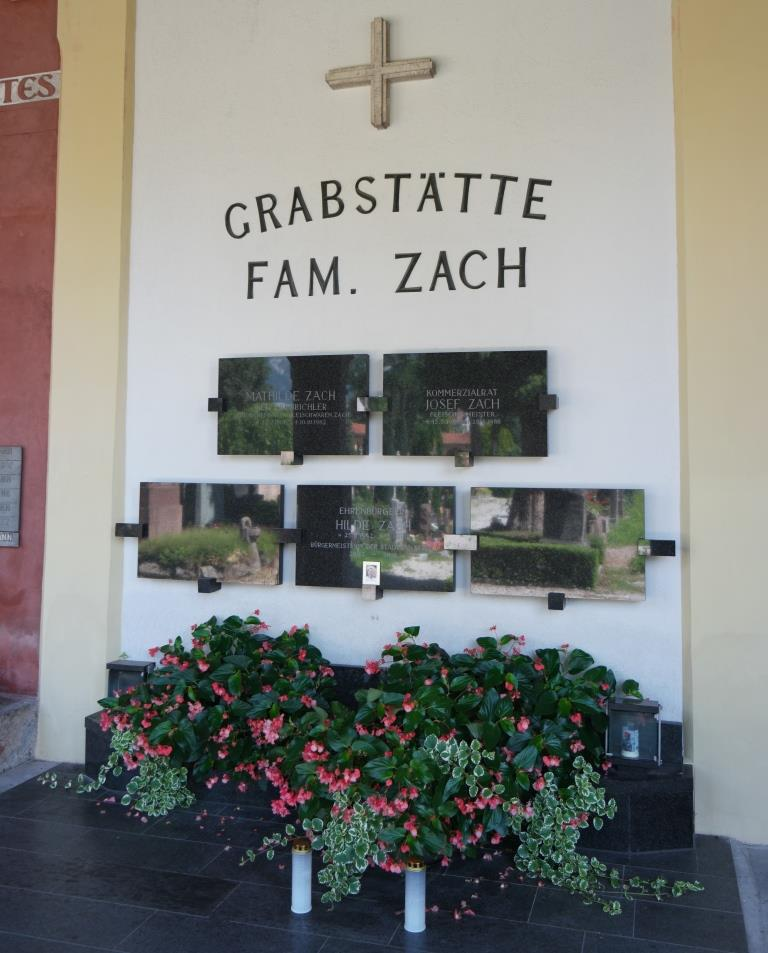
Tombstone of Hilde Zach

Hilde Zach (August 25, 1942 – January 15, 2011) was the mayor of Innsbruck, Austria. She was elected in 2002 by the city council, becoming the city's first woman mayor. She resigned due to poor health in February 2010. Zach came from a business background, having run a business that had previously been run by her parents.

== Awards ==
- 2005: Cross of the Order pro merito Melitensi of the Sovereign Military Order of Malta
- 2005: Grand Decoration of Honour in Gold for Services to Republic of Austria (Großes goldenes Ehrenzeichen für Verdienste um die Republik Österreich)
- 2010: Honorary citizen of Innsbruck (Ehrenbürgerin der Stadt Innsbruck)
- 2011: Knight's Cross of the Order of Merit of the Republic of Poland (posthumously)
