= Johann Traxler =

Austrian cyclist

Personal information
- Born: 6 February 1959 Freistadt, Austria
- Died: 11 August 2011 (aged 52) Bad Goisern, Austria

Cycling career
- Sport: Cycling

Johann Traxler (6 February 1959 – 11 August 2011) was an Austrian cyclist. He competed at the 1980 Summer Olympics and the 1984 Summer Olympics.
