= Wolfgang Brezinka =

German-Austrian educational scientist (1928–2020)

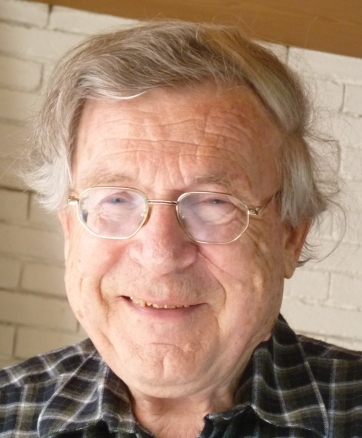
- Wolfgang Brezinka in 2011
- Born: June 9, 1928; Berlin, Germany
- Died: January 3, 2020 (aged 91); Telfes, Tyrol, Austria

Wolfgang Brezinka (June 9, 1928 – January 3, 2020) was a German-Austrian educational scientist. He served as professor of pedagogy at the School of Education of the University of Würzburg, as well as at the Universities of Innsbruck and Konstanz.

== Career ==
Brezinka earned his doctorate in 1951 at the University of Innsbruck, and earned his habilitation at the same university in 1954. He taught at the School of education of the University of Würzburg (1958–1959), as well as at the Universities of Innsbruck (1960–1967) and Konstanz (1967–1996). His research activities led him to research and studies at Columbia University (1957–1958) and Harvard University. He was a guest professor at the Philosophical-Theological University of Brixen, Italy, in 1983 and 1990. In 1984 he served as a guest professor at the University of Fribourg in Switzerland, and in 1985 he was also a guest professor at the University of South Africa in Pretoria. He was a supporter of empirical-analytical educational science, or scientific pedagogy.

After retirement as a professor emeritus, he has done extensive research with the support of the Austrian Academy of Sciences on the history of the discipline of pedagogy in Austria, which he has published in a multi-volume work "Pädagogik in Österreich. Die Geschichte des Faches an den Universitäten vom 18. bis zum 21. Jahrhundert".

== Theory ==
In his book "Metatheory of Education", Brezinka distinguishes three classes of educational theory: educational science, the philosophy of education and practical pedagogy.

His texts have appeared in numerous editions and languages (including Chinese, English, Italian, Japanese, Korean, Norwegian, Persian, Polish, Russian, Spanish, Czech). On this basis, Professor Brezinka can be regarded as the pedagogical thinker from the German-speaking world whose texts are the internationally most widely available in foreign languages.

As a practical pedagogue, he evaluates from a conservative viewpoint; as an educational scientist he has oriented himself in questions of scientific theory to the thinking of Viktor Kraft, Karl R. Popper, Hans Albert and Wolfgang Stegmüller. Orientation in educational analysis is provided by his widely quoted definition of the concept of education:

By education is understood actions through which people attempt to improve one or more person's psychic dispositional structures in some respect, preserve the components viewed as valuable or prevent the development of dispositions judged to be bad.

—

== Private life ==
Wolfgang Brezinka was married to Erika Brezinka (born Schleifer); the couple had three children (Christof, Veronika and Thomas).

Brezinka lived in Telfes im Stubai in the State of Tyrol, Austria. He died on 3 January 2020 in Telfes im Stubai.

== Honors ==
- Tyrolean Order of the Eagle (Tiroler Adler-Orden) in Gold (1984)
- Austrian Cross of Honor for Science and Art, 1st class (1989)
- Corresponding (1992) and Active Member (since 1997) of the Austrian Academy of Sciences
- Honorary Member of the Professional Association of Austrian Psychologists (1993)
- Cardinal Innitzer Prize (Vienna 1994)
- STAB Prize, Zurich (1995)
- Cross of the Order of Merit of the Federal Republic of Germany (1996)
- Honorary doctorate (Dr. phil. h.c.) of the Technical University of Braunschweig (2001)
- Golden Order of Merit for Services to Vienna (2001)
- Laurea honoris causa in educational science of the Universitá Cattolica del Sacro Cuore, Milan, Italy (May 12, 2014)

== Selected works ==
- Published in English:
  - Philosophy of Educational Knowledge: An Introduction to the Foundations of Science of education, Philosophy of Education and Practical Pedagogics (1992)
  - Belief, Morals and Education: Collected Essays on the Philosophy of Education (1994)
  - Socialization and Education: Essays in Conceptual Criticism (1994)
  - Basic Concepts of Educational Science: Analysis, Critique, Proposals. (1994)
  - Educational Aims, Educational Means, Educational Success: Contributions to a System of Science of education (1997)
- Publications in German:
  - Erziehung als Lebenshilfe – Eine Einführung in die pädagogische Situation (1957, 8th ed. 1971)
  - Von der Pädagogik zur Erziehungswissenschaft (1971, 3rd ed. 1975)
  - Die Pädagogik der Neuen Linken (1972, 6th ed. 1981)
  - Grundbegriffe der Erziehungswissenschaft (1974, 5th ed. 1990)
  - Metatheorie der Erziehung. 1978
  - Erziehung in einer wertunsicheren Gesellschaft (1986, 3rd ed. 1993)
  - Erziehungsziele, Erziehungsmittel, Erziehungserfolg (1976, 3rd ed. 1995)
  - Aufklärung über Erziehungstheorien. Beiträge zur Kritik der Pädagogik. 1989
  - Glaube, Moral und Erziehung. 1992
  - Aufklärung über Erziehungstheorien. Beiträge zur Kritik der Pädagogik. 1989
  - Glaube, Moral und Erziehung. 1992
  - Pädagogik in Österreich. Die Geschichte des Faches an den Universitäten vom 18. bis zum 21. Jahrhundert.
    - Band 1 – 3, 2000 to 2008
    - Bd. 4: Pädagogik an der Vienna University of Economics and Business und der Alpen-Adria-Universität Klagenfurt. Abschließender Überblick und Bilanz. Verlag der Österreichischen Akademie der Wissenschaften, Vienna 2014 ISBN 3700175876
  - Erziehung und Pädagogik im Kulturwandel. 2003
  - Gesammelte Werke. Collected works in 10 volumes on CD-ROM. 2007

== Literature about Wolfgang Brezinka ==
- "Wolfgang Brezinka," in: Walter Habel (ed.), Wer ist wer? Das deutsche who's who. 2008/2009. Schmidt-Römhild, Lübeck 2008 ISBN 3795020468 p. 156
- "Wolfgang Brezinka," in: Kürschners Deutscher Gelehrten-Kalender 2009. K. G. Saur, Munich
- Richard Olechowski: Wolfgang Brezinka – Begründer der Wissenschaftstheorie der Empirischen Erziehungswissenschaft, Retrospektiven in Sachen Bildung, R. 2, Nr. 49, Klagenfurt 2004
- Heinz-Elmar Thenorth: Wolfgang Brezinka: Wissenschaftliche Pädagogik im Spiegel ihrer ungelösten Probleme. Retrospektiven in Sachen Bildung, R. 2, Nr. 46, Klagenfurt 2004. (Also in: Pädagogische Rundschau 58, 2004, H. 4, pp. 453–465, and in: Mitteilungsblatt des Förderkreises der BBF 15 [2004], pp. 22–37. Volltext)
- Siegfried Uhl (ed.): Wolfgang Brezinka. 50 Jahre erlebte Pädagogik. Reinhardt, Munich 1997, ISBN 3-497-01447-8
- C. D'Hondt: Wolfgang Brezinka over het wetenschapskarakter van de pedagogik. 1977
- Susanne Barkowski: Wolfgang Brezinka wird 80 Jahre alt. In: "Erziehungswissenschaft – Mitteilungen der Deutschen Gesellschaft für Erziehungswissenschaft" DGfE, Heft 37, 2008, pp. 120–122.
