= Rudolf Gelbard =

Austrian Holocaust survivor (1930–2018)

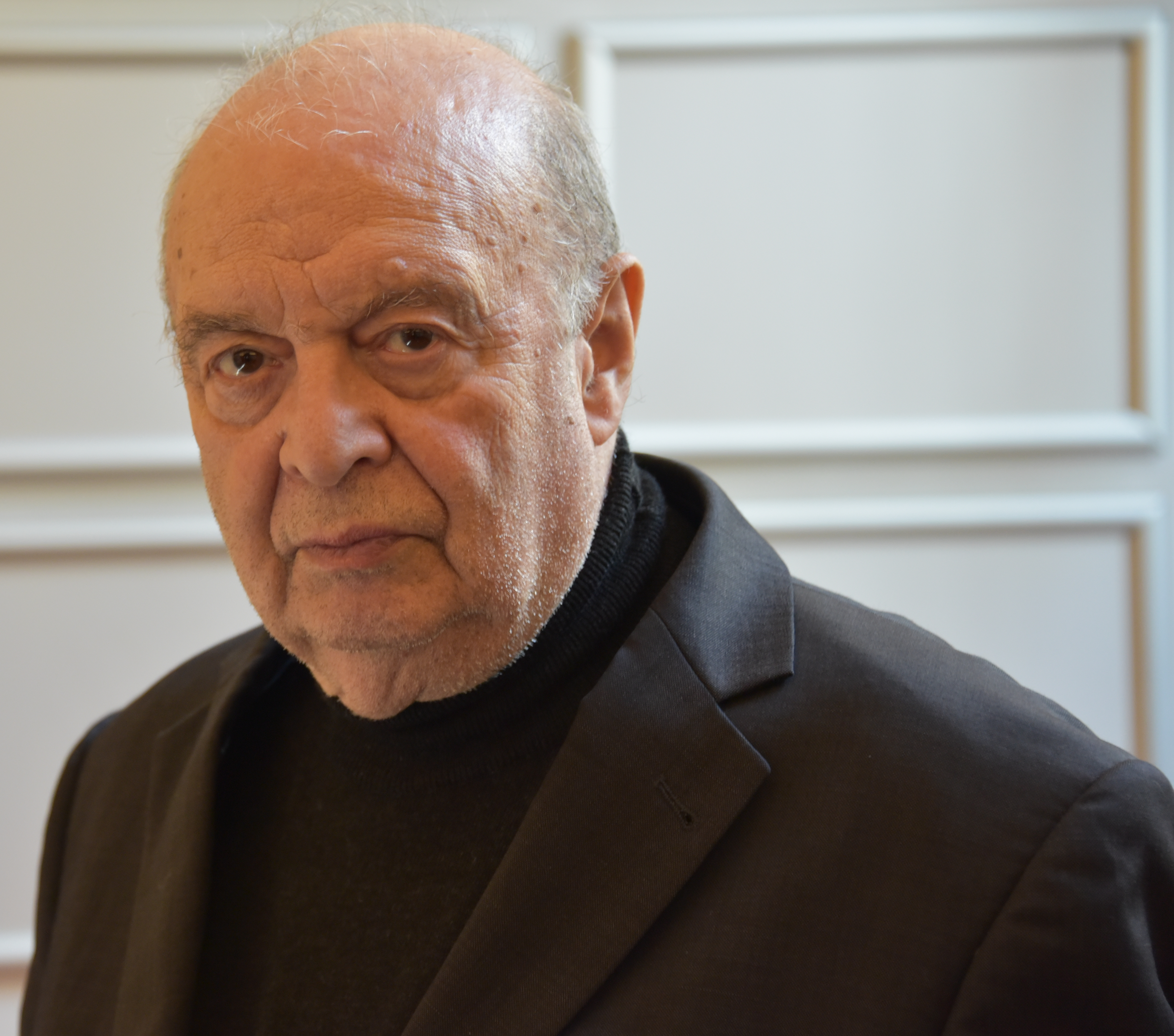
- Burgtheater (Vienna), 2014
- Born: 4 December 1930; Vienna, Austria
- Died: 24 October 2018 (aged 87); Vienna, Austria
- Known for: Holocaust survivor Political campaigner

Rudolf Gelbard (4 December 1930 – 24 October 2018) was an Austrian Holocaust survivor and political campaigner against antisemitism and neo-Nazism. He lectured in schools and universities about his experiences during the Holocaust, and also appeared in a 2007 documentary film about his experiences.

== Personal life ==
Rudolf Gelbard was born in Vienna, Austria, and lived in the Leopoldstadt district. His parents were Jewish. After the Anschluss, in which Germany took control of Austria, Gelbard was excluded from his school because of his Jewish ancestry. Gelbard witnessed first-hand the Nazi persecution of the Jews during Kristallnacht. In 1942, Gelbard and his parents were transported to the Theresienstadt concentration camp. 19 members of Gelbard's family died at Theresienstadt, but Gelbard survived because he was in the children's section of the camp.

Gelbard was married twice. His daughter from his first marriage died in 1972, at the age of 17. His second marriage began in 1990, and lasted until his death.

== Career ==
After his liberation from Theresienstadt concentration camp, Gelbard fought to oppose antisemitism and neo-Nazi activities. In 1946, he protested against antisemitic riots at the University of Vienna, and in 1955, he protested to prevent a proposed anti-Semitic lecture by Fritz Stüber. In 1965, Gelbard was a witness to the death of Ernst Kirchweger. He was a member of the Federation of Social Democratic Freedom Fighters, during which time he campaigned for education in schools about Nazi war crimes. He lectured in schools and universities about his personal experience of the Holocaust. In 2017, SOS Mitmensch posted a video of Gelbard on Facebook. In the video, he was speaking out against the Freedom Party of Austria, due to its association with right-wing groups, and saying that such a party does not belong in the Austrian Government. The video received over 100,000 views.

From 1954 to 1963, Gelbard worked for the Ministry of Social Affairs. He later worked as a merchant, before becoming editor of the Kurier in 1975. He worked for the Kurier from 1975 until 1990. Gelbard was also a cultural officer for the Jewish Israelites in Austria.

In 2007, Gelbard starred in a documentary film about his life. The film was produced by Kurt Brazda, and titled Der Mann auf dem Balkon, Rudolf Gelbard, KZ-Überlebender – Zeitzeuge – Homo Politicus (The Man on the Balcony' Rudolf Gelbard, Concentration camp survivor – eyewitness – Homo Politicus). The film focused on his childhood experiences of antisemitic persecution and his transportation to Theresienstadt. During the filming of the documentary, Gelbard visited Theresienstadt for the first time since his liberation in 1945. In 2008, Walter Kohl wrote a biography, Die dunklen Seiten des Planeten: Rudi Gelbard, der Kämpfer (The dark sides of the planet: Rudi Gelbard, the fighter), about Gelbard's life. In his later years, Gelbard starred in the documentary play The Last Witnesses at the Burgtheater in Vienna, in Frankfurt, Berlin and Dresden.

=== Awards ===
- 2005: Decoration for Services to Vienna.
- 2011: Decoration of Honour for Services to the Republic of Austria.
- 2016: Viktor Adler badge.

== Death ==
Gelbard died on 24 October 2018 in Vienna after a long illness. He was 87. Speaking about Gelbard's death, Austrian President Alexander Van der Bellen said that "Austria has lost an important witness of the Shoah, a vigilant warning voice against anti-Semitism and a committed fighter for democracy." Gelbard was buried in the Vienna Central Cemetery in a tomb of honour provided by the City Council.
