= Erwin Pröll =

Austrian politician, governor of Lower Austria 1992–2017

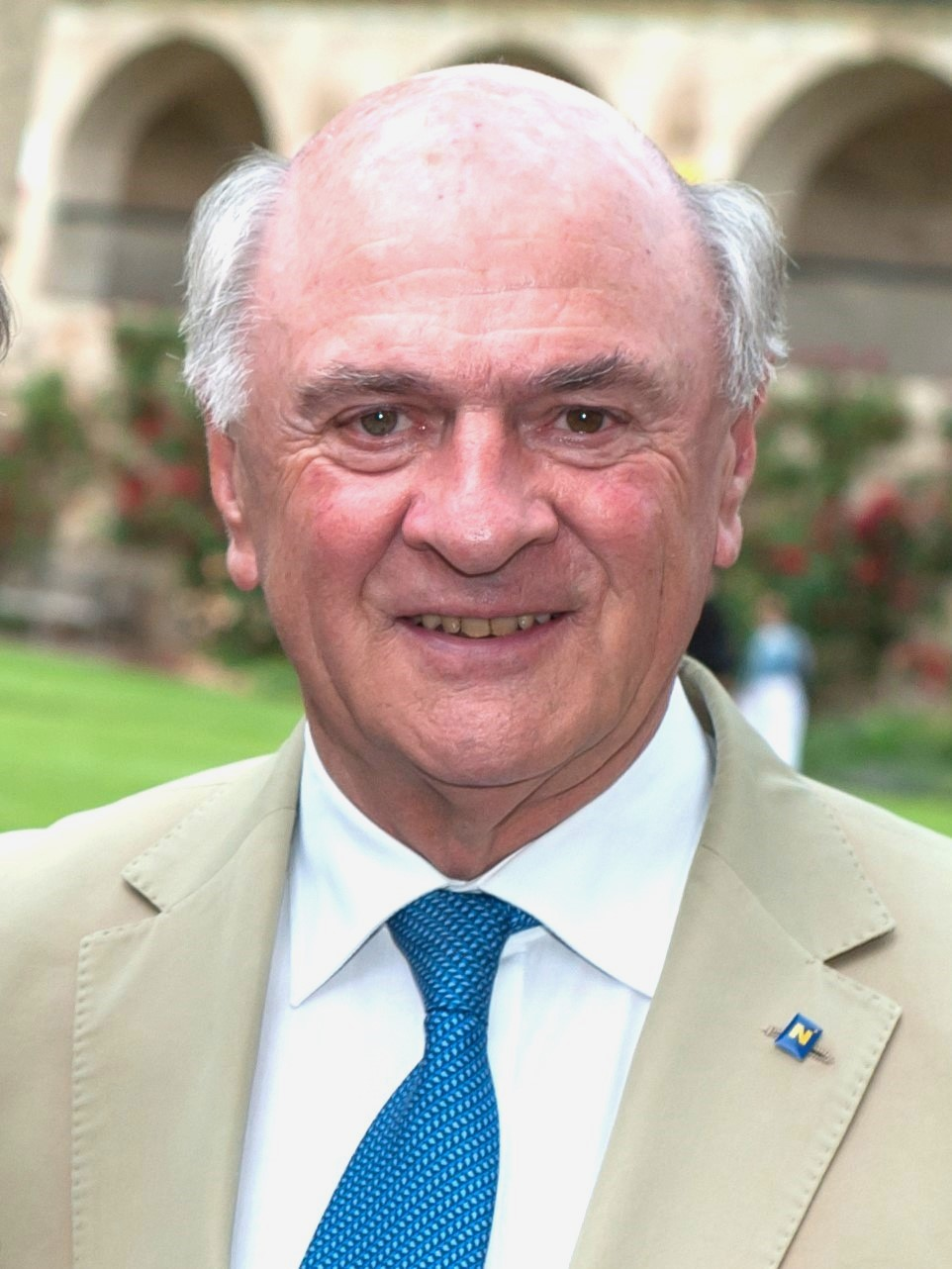
- Erwin Pröll in 2016

Governor of Lower Austria
- In office 22 October 1992 – 19 April 2017
- Preceded by: Siegfried Ludwig
- Succeeded by: Johanna Mikl-Leitner

Personal details
- Born: 24 December 1946 (age 78); Ziersdorf-Radlbrunn, Allied-occupied Austria
- Political party: Austrian People's Party

Erwin Pröll (born 24 December 1946) is an Austrian conservative politician (ÖVP). From 1992 to 2017, he was the Governor of Lower Austria.

He was born in Radlbrunn, Lower Austria and after obtaining his Matura at Tulln he studied at the University of Natural Resources (BOKU), Vienna.

== Political life ==
The transfer of the regional administration of Lower Austria from Vienna to Sankt Pölten took place during his administration.

Pröll is seen as a supporter of a Grand Coalition between the ÖVP and Social Democratic Party (SPÖ). In the year 2000 he was still a supporter of the "black-blue" coalition (ÖVP with the Freedom Party (FPÖ)), but two years later argued against such an arrangement. Pröll also has a good relationship with Viennese mayor Michael Häupl (SPÖ).

Great interest was aroused in Europe when he proposed a tax on mobile phone masts in the state of Lower Austria. Together with the SPÖ he suggested legally regulating mobile phone transmitters, with the aim of reducing the overall number. At the same time the state planned to set up a local telecommunications infrastructure by means of a Wireless LAN.

After an agreement with the mobile radio companies, the taxation was not realized. The agreement in fact was used as an example for other regions.

In 2006 he hosted a conference with EU politicians over subsidiarity in Sankt Pölten.

Pröll is married with four children. He is the uncle of Josef Pröll, former Austrian Vice Chancellor and Minister of Finance.

He is imperial Knight of Honor of the Order of St. George.

The magazine Falter in 2002 reported the response by regional party secretary Ernst Strasser to criticism of Pröll's confession that he had only ever managed to finish one book, Karl May's cowboy novel Der Schatz im Silbersee (The Treasure of Silver Lake): "People like that, at least it shows the governor isn't a know-all."

In September 2014, in an interview with the newspaper Kurier, he denied any interest in being a candidate for the Presidential election due in 2016, saying the idea left him cold: "My life plan is different". Reports in April 2015, however, suggested that he had sounded out the idea with his staff.
