= Günther Platter =

Austrian politician (born 1954)

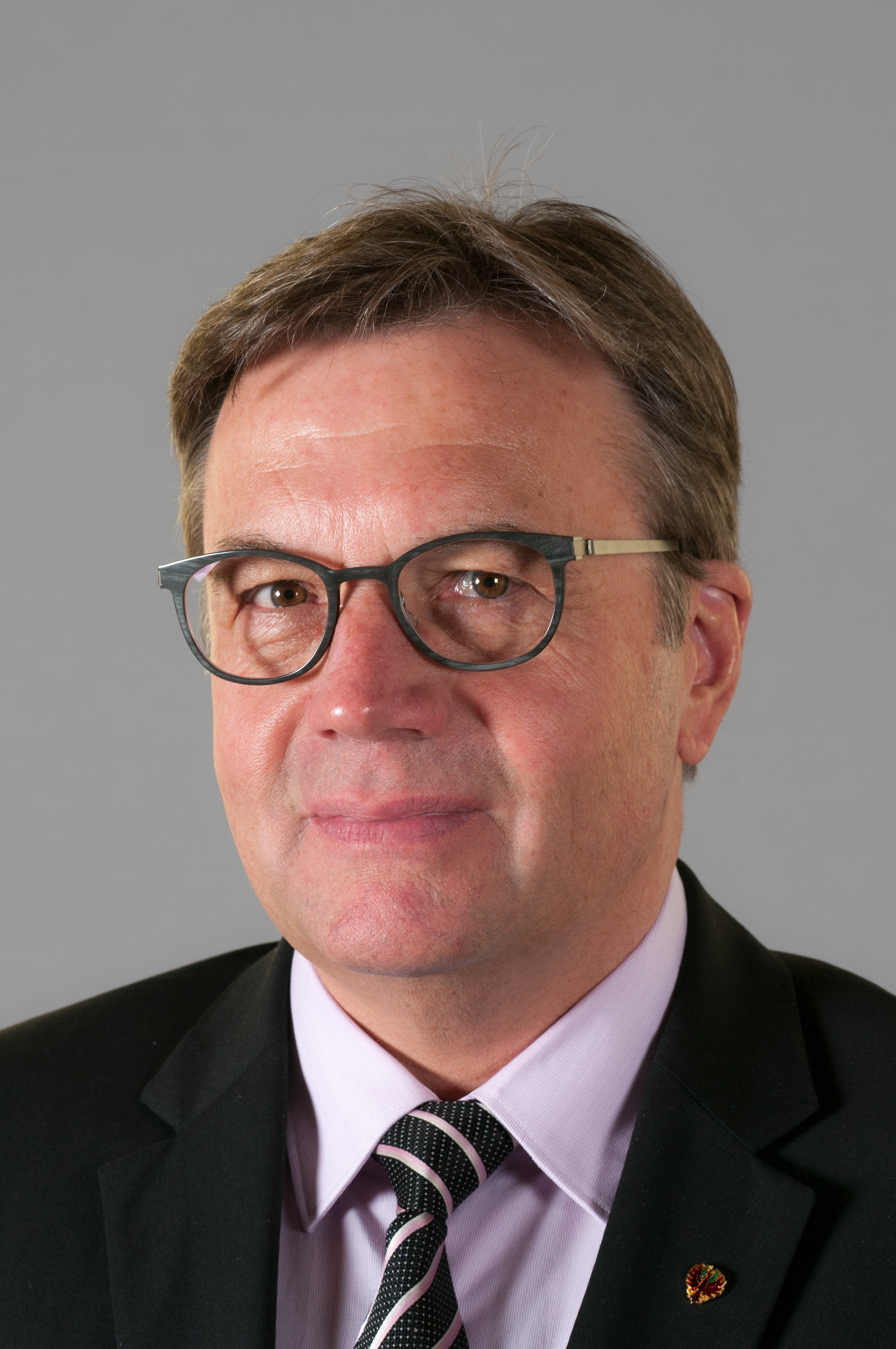
- Official portrait, 2017

Governor of Tyrol
- In office 1 July 2008 – 25 October 2022
- Chancellor: Alfred Gusenbauer; Werner Faymann; Christian Kern; Sebastian Kurz; Brigitte Bierlein; Sebastian Kurz; Alexander Schallenberg; Karl Nehammer
- Preceded by: Herwig van Staa
- Succeeded by: Anton Mattle

Minister of the Interior
- In office 11 January 2007 – 30 June 2008
- Chancellor: Alfred Gusenbauer
- Preceded by: Wolfgang Schüssel (Acting)
- Succeeded by: Wilhelm Molterer (Acting)

Minister of Defence
- In office 28 February 2003 – 11 January 2007
- Chancellor: Wolfgang Schüssel
- Preceded by: Herbert Scheibner
- Succeeded by: Norbert Darabos

Personal details
- Born: 7 June 1954 (age 71) Zams, Tyrol, Austria
- Party: ÖVP

Günther Platter (born 7 June 1954) is an Austrian politician for the Austrian People's Party (ÖVP) and was the governor of Tyrol between 2008 and 2022, succeeding Herwig van Staa. Before becoming governor, Platter served as interior minister and as Minister of Defence in the cabinets of Gusenbauer and Schüssel.
