= List of governors of Tyrol =

This is a list of governors of the Austrian state of Tyrol:

№	Portrait	Name	Term			Party	Period
№	Portrait	Name	Took office	Left office	Duration	Party	Period
1		Josef Schraffl	30 October 1918	6 June 1921		Christian Social	First Republic (1918–1934)
2		Franz Stumpf	7 June 1921	28 February 1935		Christian Social; Fatherland's Front	First Republic (1918–1934)
3		Josef Schumacher	21 March 1935	12 March 1938		Fatherland's Front	Austrofascism (1934–1938)
(Governor and Gauleiter)							Nazi Germany (1938–1945)
4		Edmund Christoph	13 March 1938	24 May 1938		NSDAP	Nazi Germany (1938–1945)
5		Franz Hofer	24 May 1938	3 May 1945		NSDAP	Nazi Germany (1938–1945)
6		Karl Gruber	4 May 1945	20 October 1945		ÖVP	Second Republic (1945–present)
7		Alfons Weißgatterer	20 October 1945	31 January 1951		ÖVP	Second Republic (1945–present)
8		Alois Grauß	27 February 1951	12 November 1957		ÖVP	Second Republic (1945–present)
9		Hans Tschiggfrey	12 November 1957	30 June 1963		ÖVP	Second Republic (1945–present)
10		Eduard Wallnöfer	30 June 1963	2 March 1987		ÖVP	Second Republic (1945–present)
11		Alois Partl	5 March 1987	24 September 1993		ÖVP	Second Republic (1945–present)
12		Wendelin Weingartner	24 September 1993	26 October 2002		ÖVP	Second Republic (1945–present)
13		Herwig van Staa	26 October 2002	1 July 2008		ÖVP	Second Republic (1945–present)
14		Günther Platter	1 July 2008	25 October 2022		ÖVP	Second Republic (1945–present)
15		Anton Mattle	25 October 2022	Incumbent		ÖVP	Second Republic (1945–present)

== See also ==
- Tyrol
