= List of governors of Vorarlberg =

Governor of Vorarlberg
- Landeshauptmann von Vorarlberg
- Coat of arms of Vorarlberg

- Flag of Vorarlberg

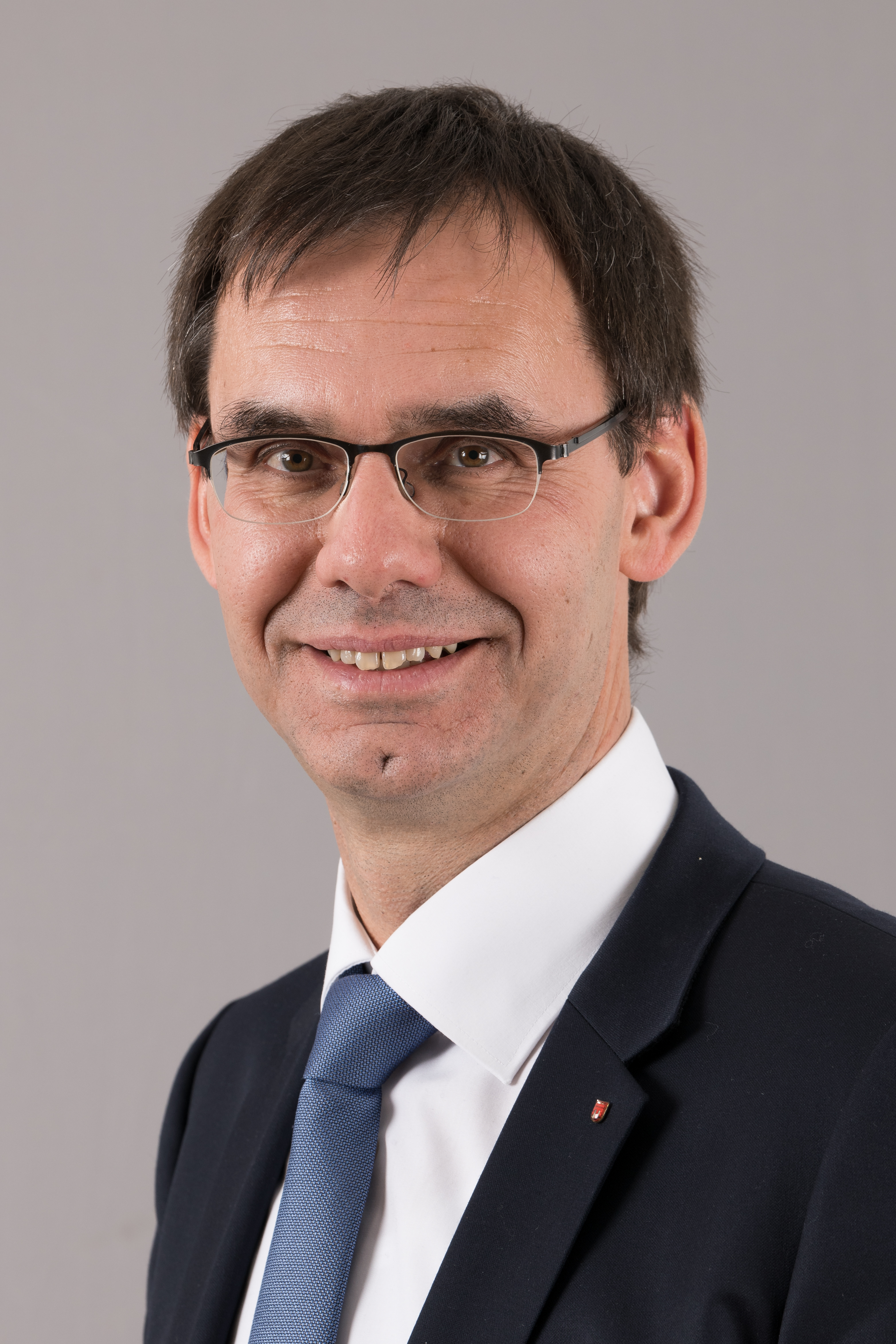
- Incumbent; Markus Wallner since 7 December 2011
- Style: Mr. Governor (formal)
- Status: Landeshauptmann
- Member of: Vorarlberger Landtag
- Seat: Neues Landhaus, Bregenz
- Nominator: Political Parties
- Appointer: Landtag sworn in by the President
- Term length: five years (no term limit)
- Constituting instrument: Federal Constitutional Law
- Formation: 1860
- First holder: Sebastian Ritter von Froschauer
- Website: vorarlberg.at

This is a list of governors of Vorarlberg, a state in Austria.

== List of officeholders ==
№	Portrait	Name	Term			Party	Period
№	Portrait	Name	Took office	Left office	Duration	Party	Period
1		Sebastian Ritter von Froschauer	1860	6 April 1873			Habsburg monarchy (1860–1918)
2		Anton Jussel	27 June 1873	23 July 1878		Liberal	Habsburg monarchy (1860–1918)
3		Karl Graf von Belrupt-Tissac	21 September 1878	21 September 1890			Habsburg monarchy (1860–1918)
4		Adolf Rhomberg	21 September 1890	3 November 1918		Catholic-Conservative	Habsburg monarchy (1860–1918)
5		Otto Ender	3 November 1918	9 December 1930		Christian Social	First Republic (1918–1934)
6		Ferdinand Redler	9 December 1930	14 July 1931		Christian Social	First Republic (1918–1934)
(5)		Otto Ender	14 July 1931	24 July 1934		Christian Social	First Republic (1918–1934)
7		Ernst Winsauer	24 July 1934	13 March 1938		Fatherland Front	Austrofascism (1934–1938)
8		Anton Plankensteiner as Reichsstatthalter and Gauleiter	13 March 1938	1 February 1940		NSDAP	Nazi Germany (1938–1945)
On 1 February 1940, the territory of Vorarlberg was merged into the Reichsgau Tirol-Vorarlberg under Franz Hofer.							Nazi Germany (1938–1945)
9		Ulrich Ilg	24 May 1945	28 October 1964		ÖVP	Second Republic (1945–present)
10		Herbert Keßler	29 October 1964	9 July 1987		ÖVP	Second Republic (1945–present)
11		Martin Purtscher	9 July 1987	2 April 1997		ÖVP	Second Republic (1945–present)
12		Herbert Sausgruber	2 April 1997	7 December 2011		ÖVP	Second Republic (1945–present)
13		Markus Wallner	7 December 2011	Incumbent		ÖVP	Second Republic (1945–present)
