= Markus Wallner =

Austrian politician (born 1967)

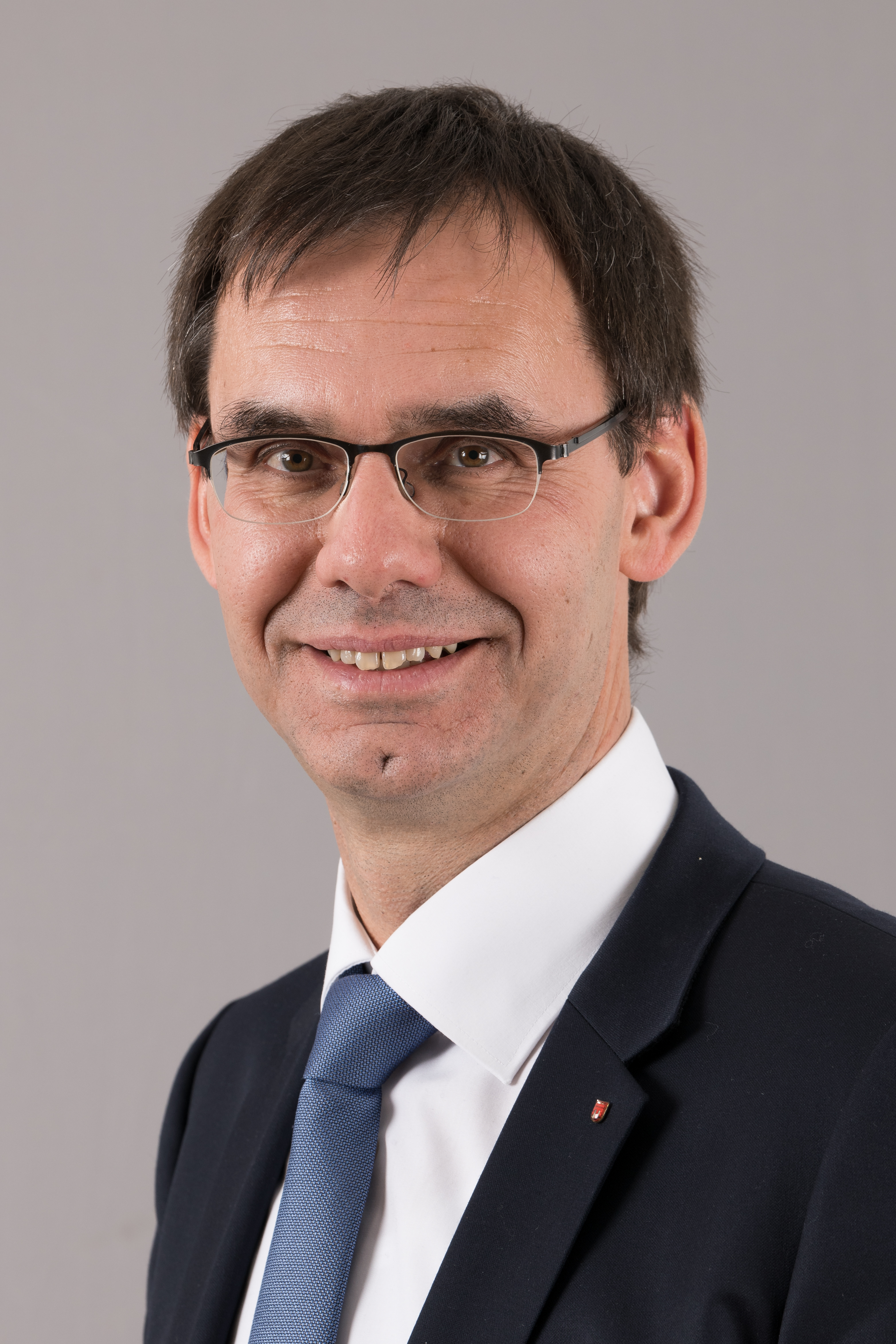

Governor of Vorarlberg
- Incumbent
- Assumed office 7 December 2011
- Deputy: Christof Bitschi
- Preceded by: Herbert Sausgruber

Personal details
- Born: 20 July 1967 (age 59) Bludenz, Austria
- Party: People's Party

Markus Wallner (born 20 July 1967) is an Austrian politician (ÖVP). Since 2011, he has been the governor of Vorarlberg.

== Life and work ==
Markus Wallner was born on 20 July 1967, the son of Herwig and Theresia Wallner in the district capital of Bludenz. He graduated from his gymnasium in 1985. After graduation he began to study political science and history at the University of Innsbruck, where he was the chairman of the Student Union. In the Association of Industrialists Vorarlberg, he was then in charge of public relations in 1993. On 18 August 1995, he married his wife Sonja, and has three children.

=== Political beginnings ===
In 1994, Wallner was first went into politics in contact when he formally became a member of the Austrian People's Party and was employed in the provincial office of the Vorarlberg People's Party in Bregenz. On 19 April 1995 he also had his first political office as a member of the municipal council of his home town of Frastanz. In April 1997, he became the personal assistant of Governor Herbert Sausgruber on 1 November 1999 until his appointment as country manager of the ÖVP Vorarlberg.

=== National politics ===
On 11 October 2000, Wallner followed his party colleague Greti Schmid as Regional Minister in the Government of Vorarlberg. From 29 January 2003, he served in the State Parliament of Vorarlberg as the post of club chairman of the ÖVP parliamentary group. On 13 December 2006, a mandate announced Wallner as a replacement of the resigning Hans-Peter Bischof from the provincial government as state governor, therefore Wallner took over as Governor Deputy. As such, his area of responsibility covered in the Vorarlberg state government on the areas of health law and social security, medical matters, disability assistance and, since 2009, building construction, building industry, mechanical engineering, and electrical engineering as well as cable cars and lift technology. Until 2009 he was also responsible for culture, education, archives and libraries, and music schools, but the responsibility went to Andrea Kaufmann.

=== As head of state in politics ===
On 7 October 2011, Markus Wallner was nominated by former Vorarlberg governor Herbert Sausgruber as his successor. Subsequently, Wallner took over on October 18, initially a caretaker and since 17 March 2012, he officially became the chairman of the provincial party of the Vorarlberg People's Party.

On 7 December 2011, Wallner was elected by the deputies to be the provincial governor. He formed the Black-Green Coalition with the people of the Vorarlberg countryside. The Office shall exercise his deputy as state governor in the current state government Wallner with his party colleague Karlheinz Rüdisser.

In the Vorarlberg Regional Elections 2024 the ÖVP lost 5,2 percentage points compared to the last election in 2019 and landed at 38,3 per cent of the overall vote—the worst election result of any conservative party in Vorarlberg since 1919.

For the second half of 2026 Wallner heads the Conference of State Governors.

== Criticism ==
In May 2022 a motion of no confidence against Wallner was rejected in the Vorarlberg State Parliament. In June 2023 an investigation against Wallner—Wirtschaftsbundaffäre—was closed.

In September 2026 mismanagement at Brand Vorarlberg became public.

== Honours ==
- Grand Cross of the Order of Merit of the Principality of Liechtenstein (20 December 2022).
