= 1981 in Austria =

- Decades: 1960s; 1970s; 1980s; 1990s; 2000s
- See also: Other events of 1981; List of years in Austria

Events from 1981 in Austria.

== Incumbents ==
- President – Rudolf Kirchschläger
- Chancellor – Bruno Kreisky

=== Governors ===
- Burgenland: Theodor Kery
- Carinthia: Leopold Wagner
- Lower Austria: Andreas Maurer (until 22 January); Siegfried Ludwig (from 22 January)
- Salzburg: Wilfried Haslauer Sr.
- Styria: Josef Krainer junior
- Tyrol: Eduard Wallnöfer
- Upper Austria: Josef Ratzenböck
- Vienna: Leopold Gratz
- Vorarlberg: Herbert Keßler

== Events ==
- 4 May – The European Law Students' Association (ELSA) is founded in Vienna by law students from Austria, West Germany, Poland and Hungary.

== Births ==
- 21 July – Aleksandar Đorđević, footballer

== Deaths ==
- 3 January – Alfred Proksch (born 1898)
- 5 January – Walter Feistritzer, ice hockey player (born 1920)
- 8 January – Margarete Markl, sculptor (born 1902)
- 27 November – Lotte Lenya, singer and actress (born 1891)
