= 1980 in Austria =

- Decades: 1960s; 1970s; 1980s; 1990s; 2000s
- See also: Other events of 1980; List of years in Austria

Events from 1980 in Austria.

== Incumbents ==
- President – Rudolf Kirchschläger
- Chancellor – Bruno Kreisky

=== Governors ===
- Burgenland: Theodor Kery
- Carinthia: Leopold Wagner
- Lower Austria: Andreas Maurer
- Salzburg: Wilfried Haslauer Sr.
- Styria: Friedrich Niederl (until 4 July); Josef Krainer junior (from 4 July)
- Tyrol: Eduard Wallnöfer
- Upper Austria: Josef Ratzenböck
- Vienna: Leopold Gratz
- Vorarlberg: Herbert Keßler

== Events ==
- 6 January – The 1979–80 Four Hills Tournament concludes at the Paul-Ausserleitner-Schanze in Bischofshofen. The event has a record field of competitors from 19 countries.
- 12 January – The annual Hahnenkamm downhill ski race is won by Canada's Ken Read, the event's first non-European winner.
- 10 March – The 1980 Vienna Diplomatic Conference opens.
- 18 May – In the 1980 Austrian presidential election, Rudolf Kirchschläger is re-elected with the support of both major parties and 80% of the vote.

== Births ==
- 15 March – Jan Marsalek, businessman and spy

== Deaths ==
- 3 January – Joy Adamson, Austrian-born naturalist (born 1910; murdered)
- 14 February – Victor Gruen, Austrian architect (born 1903)
- 22 February – Oskar Kokoschka, artist, poet and playwright (born 1886)
- 21 October – Hans Asperger, physician (born 1906)
