= 1983 in Austria =

- Decades: 1960s; 1970s; 1980s; 1990s; 2000s
- See also: Other events of 1983; List of years in Austria

Events from 1983 in Austria.

== Incumbents ==
- President – Rudolf Kirchschläger
- Chancellor – (until 24 May) Bruno Kreisky; (from 24 May) Fred Sinowatz

=== Governors ===
- Burgenland: Theodor Kery
- Carinthia: Leopold Wagner
- Lower Austria: Siegfried Ludwig
- Salzburg: Wilfried Haslauer Sr.
- Styria: Josef Krainer junior
- Tyrol: Eduard Wallnöfer
- Upper Austria: Josef Ratzenböck
- Vienna: Leopold Gratz
- Vorarlberg: Herbert Keßler

== Events ==
- 24 April – In the 1983 Austrian legislative election, the Socialist Party wins 90 out of a possible 183 seats to secure a fifth term in government, prompting Bruno Kreisky to stand down as SPÖ leader.
- 14 August – The 1983 Austrian Grand Prix is held at the Österreichring, and is won by Alain Prost in a Renault.
- Unknown date – The Vienna Vikings American football club is established.

== Births ==
- 18 August – Cesár Sampson, singer, songwriter, producer

== Deaths ==
- 20 January – Felix Pipes, tennis player (born 1887)
- 30 January – Fritz Machlup, Austrian-born economist (born 1902)
- 12 June – Clemens Holzmeister, architect and stage designer (born 1886)
- 31 July – Eva Pawlik, figure skater and actress, first female skating commentator (born 1927)
- 26 December – Hans Liska, Austrian-born German artist (born 1907)
