= 1979 in Austria =

- Decades: 1950s; 1960s; 1970s; 1980s; 1990s
- See also: Other events of 1979; List of years in Austria

Events from 1979 in Austria.

== Incumbents ==
- President – Rudolf Kirchschläger
- Chancellor – Bruno Kreisky

=== Governors ===
- Burgenland: Theodor Kery
- Carinthia: Leopold Wagner
- Lower Austria: Andreas Maurer
- Salzburg: Wilfried Haslauer Sr.
- Styria: Friedrich Niederl
- Tyrol: Eduard Wallnöfer
- Upper Austria: Josef Ratzenböck
- Vienna: Leopold Gratz
- Vorarlberg: Herbert Keßler

== Events ==
- 19 April – Andreas Mihavecz unintentionally breaks the record for surviving the longest without any food or liquids after being mistakenly put into custody in a holding cell in Bregenz and left there for 18 days.
- 6 May – In the Austrian legislative election, the country's Socialist Party wins a fourth consecutive term in government.
- 23 August – The Vienna International Centre is inaugurated.

== Births ==
- 9 April – Mario Matt, Olympic alpine skier

== Deaths ==
- 13 July – Ludwig Merwart, Austrian painter and graphic artist (born 1913)
