= 1982 in Austria =

- Decades: 1960s; 1970s; 1980s; 1990s; 2000s
- See also: Other events of 1982; List of years in Austria

Events from 1982 in Austria.

== Incumbents ==
- President – Rudolf Kirchschläger
- Chancellor – Bruno Kreisky

=== Governors ===
- Burgenland: Theodor Kery
- Carinthia: Leopold Wagner
- Lower Austria: Siegfried Ludwig
- Salzburg: Wilfried Haslauer Sr.
- Styria: Josef Krainer junior
- Tyrol: Eduard Wallnöfer
- Upper Austria: Josef Ratzenböck
- Vienna: Leopold Gratz
- Vorarlberg: Herbert Keßler

== Events ==
- 23 January – Niki Lauda returns to Formula One competition after an absence of two years to partner John Watson at McLaren.

== Deaths ==
- 3 January – Leo Stern (born 1898)
- 12 January – Rainer Hinteregger (born 1944), Olympic rower
- 25 March – Hugo Huppert, Austrian poet, writer and translator (born 1902)
- 2 May – Helmut Dantine (born 1918)
- 12 June – Karl von Frisch (born 1886), ethologist and winner of the Nobel Prize in Physiology or Medicine
- 10 July – Maria Jeritza, soprano (born 1887)
- 15 September – Edith Kallir (born 1915), Austrian-born American photographer and educator
