= 1977 in Austria =

- Decades: 1950s; 1960s; 1970s; 1980s; 1990s
- See also: Other events of 1977; List of years in Austria

Events from 1977 in Austria.

== Incumbents ==
- President – Rudolf Kirchschläger.
- Chancellor – Bruno Kreisky.

=== Governors ===
- Burgenland: Theodor Kery
- Carinthia: Leopold Wagner
- Lower Austria: Andreas Maurer
- Salzburg: Hans Lechner (until 20 April), Wilfried Haslauer Sr. (starting 20 April)
- Styria: Friedrich Niederl
- Tyrol: Eduard Wallnöfer
- Upper Austria: Erwin Wenzl (until 19 October), Josef Ratzenböck (starting 19 October)
- Vienna: Leopold Gratz
- Vorarlberg: Herbert Keßler

== Events ==
- August 14 – The 1977 Austrian Grand Prix was held at the Österreichring in Spielberg, Styria, Austrian with Niki Lauda won in second place.
- 1977 ICF Canoe Slalom World Championships was held in Spittal, Austria.

== Births ==
- May 18 – Mirjam Jäger-Fischer, Austrian politician.

== Deaths ==
- March 4 – Ernst Girzick, SS officer (b. 1911)
- March 9 – Karl Hartl, film director (b. 1899)
- April 12 – Franz Jonas, politician, President of Austria (b. 1899)
- September 21 – Rosette Anday, operatic mezzo-soprano (b. 1903)
- November 18 – Kurt Schuschnigg, former chancellor of the Federal State of Austria (b. 1897)
