= 1978 in Austria =

- Decades: 1950s; 1960s; 1970s; 1980s; 1990s
- See also: Other events of 1978; List of years in Austria

Events from 1978 in Austria.

== Incumbents ==
- President – Rudolf Kirchschläger.
- Chancellor – Bruno Kreisky.

=== Governors ===
- Burgenland: Theodor Kery
- Carinthia: Leopold Wagner
- Lower Austria: Andreas Maurer
- Salzburg: Wilfried Haslauer Sr.
- Styria: Friedrich Niederl
- Tyrol: Eduard Wallnöfer
- Upper Austria: Josef Ratzenböck
- Vienna: Leopold Gratz
- Vorarlberg: Herbert Keßler

== Events ==
- 8 May – Peter Habeler of Austria, along with Reinhold Messner (Italy), makes the first ascent of Mount Everest, without supplemental oxygen.

== Births ==
- 28 February – Benjamin Raich, Austrian skier
- 27 June – Petra Frey, singer

== Deaths ==
- 14 January – Kurt Gödel, Austrian-born logician, mathematician, and philosopher (b. 1906)
- 27 January – Oscar Homolka, Austrian actor (b. 1898)
- 30 November – Otto Kallir, Austrian-American art historian, author, publisher, and gallerist (b. 1894)
