= 1975 in Austria =

- Decades: 1950s; 1960s; 1970s; 1980s; 1990s
- See also: Other events of 1975; List of years in Austria

Events from the year 1975 in Austria.

== Incumbents ==
- President – Rudolf Kirchschläger
- Chancellor – Bruno Kreisky

=== Governors ===
- Burgenland: Theodor Kery
- Carinthia: Leopold Wagner
- Lower Austria: Andreas Maurer
- Salzburg: Hans Lechner
- Styria: Friedrich Niederl
- Tyrol: Eduard Wallnöfer
- Upper Austria: Erwin Wenzl
- Vienna: Leopold Gratz
- Vorarlberg: Herbert Keßler

== Events ==
- 14-16 March – The FIS Ski Flying World Championships 1975 take place in Bad Mitterndorf.
- 5 October – The 1975 Austrian legislative election is won by the Social Democratic Party of Austria (SPÖ).
- 21 December – OPEC siege

== Births ==
- 3 March – Patric Chiha, film director and screenwriter

== Deaths ==
- 7 March – Erika Abels d'Albert, painter and designer (b. 1896)
- 24 April – Sophie Schulz, politician (b. 1905)
- 27 June – Robert Stolz, composer, songwriter and conductor (b. 1880)
- 20 August – Karl Schwanzer, architect (b. 1918)
