= 1972 in Austria =

- Decades: 1950s; 1960s; 1970s; 1980s; 1990s
- See also: Other events of 1972; List of years in Austria

Events from the year 1972 in Austria.

== Incumbents ==
- President: Franz Jonas
- Chancellor: Bruno Kreisky

=== Governors ===
- Burgenland: Theodor Kery
- Carinthia: Hans Sima
- Lower Austria: Andreas Maurer
- Salzburg: Hans Lechner
- Styria: Friedrich Niederl
- Tyrol: Eduard Wallnöfer
- Upper Austria: Erwin Wenzl
- Vienna: Felix Slavik
- Vorarlberg: Herbert Keßler

== Events ==
- 1 January – Future President of Austria Kurt Waldheim becomes Secretary-General of the United Nations.

== Births ==
- 12 January – Toto Wolff, racing driver
- 29 November – Andreas Goldberger, ski jumper
- 7 December – Hermann Maier, Alpine ski racer

== Deaths ==
- 12 June: Ludwig von Bertalanffy, biologist (b. 1901)
- 13 June: Stephanie von Hohenlohe, spy for Germany in World War II spy (b. 1891)
- 31 July: Alfons Gorbach, 15th Chancellor of Austria (b. 1898)
- 30 November: Hans Erich Apostel, composer (b. 1901)
- 13 December: Gustav Schwarzenegger, police officer, father of Arnold Schwarzenegger (b. 1907)
