= Ministry of Agriculture, Regions and Tourism =

Government ministry of Austria

Federal Ministry of Agriculture, Regions and Tourism
- Bundesministerium für Landwirtschaft, Regionen und Tourismus

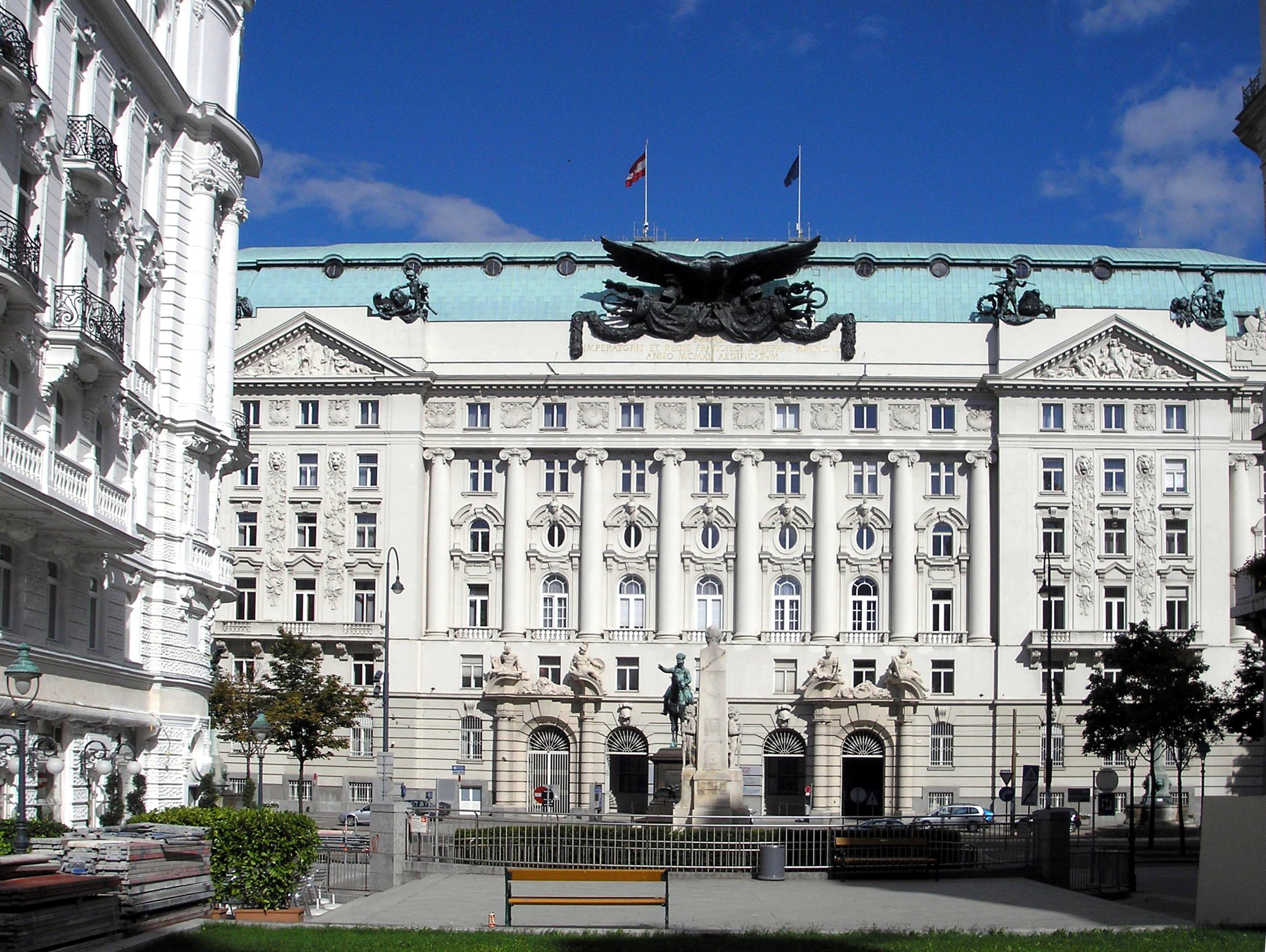

Ministry overview
- Formed: 1867
- Jurisdiction: Austria
- Headquarters: Stubenring 1 Vienna; 48°12′35″N 16°22′59″E
- Minister responsible: Norbert Totschnig
- Website: bmlrt.gv.at

In Austrian politics, the Federal Ministry of Agriculture, Regions and Tourism (German: Bundesministerium für Landwirtschaft, Regionen und Tourismus or BMLRT, although often called Nachhaltigkeitsministerium) is the ministry in charge of agricultural policy, forestry, hunting, fishing, viticulture and wine law, postal and telecommunications services, mining, animal welfare, and the tourism industry. The Ministry was first created in 2000 through a merger of the Ministry of Agriculture (Landwirtschaftsministerium) and the Ministry of Environment (Umweltministerium); it gained responsibility for the energy sector, mining, and tourism under the first Kurz cabinet in 2018.

The last Minister of Agriculture, Regions and Tourism was Elisabeth Köstinger; when she resigned in 2022 ministerial responsibilities were restructured.

== History ==
The Ministry's earliest precursor was the Cisleithanian Ministry of Agriculture (Ackerbauministerium), created in 1867. In additional to agriculture, the Ministry was responsible for regulating hunting, fishing, and hydraulic engineering, excluding hydraulic engineering of military importance. The organization was renamed to Ministry of Agriculture and Forestry (Ministerium für Land- und Forstwirtschaft) in 1918 and was briefly called a department (Staatsamt) rather than a ministry during the two periods of constitutional transition following the two World Wars. Except for the name, however, the Ministry survived mostly in its original form until 2000.

In 1972, Austria established the Ministry of Health and the Environment (Ministerium für Gesundheit und Umweltschutz, usually called Gesundheitsministerium or Umweltministerium for short). In 1987, family affairs were added to its portfolio, turning it into the Ministry of Environment, Youth and Family Affairs (Ministerium für Umwelt, Jugend und Familie)

In 2000, the two ministries were combined to form the Ministry of Agriculture, Forestry, Environment and Water Management (Ministerium für Land- und Forstwirtschaft, Umwelt und Wasserwirtschaft, although often called Lebensministerium). Responsibility for family affairs was moved to the Ministry of Social Affairs (Sozialministerium) at the time.

When the first Kurz cabinet took office in December 2017, the ministry was put in charge of the energy sector, mining, and tourism in addition to its existing powers and duties; it also gained its current designation. The additional responsibilities created an institution with exceptionally broad authority; the new ministry has been described as a "super ministry" (Superministerium) and a "behemoth" (Riese); the cabinet had difficulties finding a new name that would adequately reflect its extensive purview, the present minister has noted. The move was not completely uncontroversial.

After the Second Kurz government took office in January 2020, the ministry was renamed Federal Ministry of Agriculture, Regions and Tourism.

== Responsibilities ==
As of January 2020, the Ministry is charged with regulating, supervising, or managing, respectively:

- agricultural policy and law;
- alternative service to military service: Zivildienst also called Regionaldienst (German for "regional service")
- the food sector with the exception of food safety;
- forestry policy and law;
- domestic markets for agricultural, food and forestry products, including seeds and seed stock, animal food, fertilizer, plant protection products, including their regulatory approval, with the exception of price regulation, surveillance, and control;
- imports and exports;
- wine law and viticultural supervision;
- land reform; agricultural authorities; agricultural and forestry real estate transactions;
- measures aimed at reducing the agriculture and forestry sector's exposure to debt;
- water law and water management with the exception of the engineering aspects of waterway, water supply, and sewerage construction;
- plant protection;
- agricultural and forestry schools, including human resources management, to the extent not handles by the Chancellery;
- agricultural and forestry commodity exchanges;
- professional representation of agricultural and forestry entrepreneurs and freelancers;
- management of public real estate used for agriculture and forestry;
- hunting and fishing;
- protecting Austria's border waters and safeguarding Austria's water rights and water management interests; engineering aspects of water construction in border waters, with the exception of the Danube, the March, and the Thaya downstream from Bernhardsthal;
- mining;
- postal and telecommunications services;
- voluntary service;
- tourism.

== Structure ==
Since January 2020, the ministry consists of the Minister and her personal staff (Kabinett), the office of the general secretary, a special coordination department, and five numbered regular departments (Sektionen):

1. Water management and hydraulic engineering (Wasserwirtschaft)
2. Agriculture and rural development (Landwirtschaft und ländliche Entwicklung)
3. Forestry and Sustainability (Forstwirtschaft und Nachhaltigkeit)
4. Telecommunications and postal service and mining (Telekommunikation, Post und Bergbau)
5. Tourism and regional policy (Tourismus und Regionalpolitik)

The Minister and her staff are political appointees; the general secretary and the section heads are career civil servants.

== Ministers ==
=== First Republic ===
State Secretariat of Agriculture; Staatsamt für Landwirtschaft
Cabinet:	Secretary:	Party:	Date appointed:
Renner I	Josef Stöckler	CS	October 30, 1918
Ministry of Agriculture and Forestry; Bundesministerium für Land- und Forstwirtschaft
Cabinet:	Minister:	Party:	Date appointed:
Renner II	Josef Stöckler	CS	March 15, 1919
Renner III	Josef Stöckler	CS	October 17, 1919
Renner III	Karl Renner (interim)	SPÖ	June 24, 1920
Mayr I	Alois Haueis	CS	July 7, 1920
Mayr II	Alois Haueis	CS	November 20, 1920
Schober I	Leopold Hennet	none	June 21, 1921
Breisky	Leopold Hennet	none	January 26, 1922
Schober II	Leopold Hennet	none	January 27, 1922
Seipel I	Rudolf Buchinger	CS	May 31, 1922
Seipel II	Rudolf Buchinger	CS	April 17, 1923
Seipel III	Rudolf Buchinger	CS	November 20, 1923
Ramek I	Rudolf Buchinger	CS	November 20, 1924
Ramek II	Andreas Thaler	CS	January 15, 1926
Seipel IV	Andreas Thaler	CS	October 20, 1926
Seipel V	Andreas Thaler	CS	May 19, 1927
Streeruwitz	Florian Födermayr	CS	May 4, 1929
Schober III	Florian Födermayr	CS	September 26, 1929
Vaugoin	Andreas Thaler	CS	September 30, 1930
Ender	Andreas Thaler	CS	December 4, 1930
Ender	Engelbert Dollfuß (interim)	CS	March 18, 1931
Buresch I	Engelbert Dollfuß (interim)	CS	June 20, 1931
Buresch II	Engelbert Dollfuß (interim)	CS	January 29, 1932
Dollfuß I	Engelbert Dollfuß (interim)	CS	May 20, 1932
Dollfuß II	Engelbert Dollfuß (interim)	CS	September 21, 1932
Dollfuß II	Ernst Rüdiger Starhemberg	VF	July 26, 1934
Schuschnigg I	Josef Reither	VF	July 29, 1934
Schuschnigg I	Ludwig Strobl	VF	October 17, 1935
Schuschnigg II	Kurt Schuschnigg (interim)	VF	May 14, 1936
Schuschnigg II	Peter Mandorfer	VF	May 15, 1936
Schuschnigg III	Peter Mandorfer	VF	November 3, 1936
Schuschnigg IV	Peter Mandorfer	VF	February 16, 1938
Seyß-Inquart	Anton Reinthaller	NSDAP	March 11, 1938

=== Second Republic ===
State Secretariat of Agriculture and Forestry; Staatsamt für Land- und Forstwirtschaft
Cabinet:	Secretary:	Party:	Date appointed:
Renner	Rudolf Buchinger	ÖVP	April 27, 1945
Renner	Josef Kraus	ÖVP	September 26, 1945
Ministry of Agriculture; Bundesministerium für Landwirtschaft
Cabinet:	Minister:	Party:	Date appointed:
Figl I	Josef Kraus	ÖVP	December 20, 1945
Figl II	Josef Kraus	ÖVP	November 8, 1949
Figl II	Franz Thoma	ÖVP	January 23, 1952
Figl III	Franz Thoma	ÖVP	October 28, 1952
Raab I	Franz Thoma	ÖVP	April 2, 1953
Raab II	Franz Thoma	ÖVP	June 29, 1956
Raab III	Eduard Hartmann	ÖVP	July 16, 1959
Raab IV	Eduard Hartmann	ÖVP	November 3, 1960
Gorbach I	Eduard Hartmann	ÖVP	April 11, 1961
Gorbach II	Eduard Hartmann	ÖVP	March 27, 1963
Klaus I	Karl Schleinzer	ÖVP	April 2, 1964
Klaus II	Karl Schleinzer	ÖVP	April 19, 1966
Kreisky I	Johann Öllinger	none	April 21, 1970
Kreisky I	Oskar Weihs	SPÖ	May 22, 1970
Kreisky II	Oskar Weihs	SPÖ	November 4, 1971
Kreisky III	Oskar Weihs	SPÖ	October 28, 1975
Kreisky III	Josef Staribacher (interim)	SPÖ	October 1, 1976
Kreisky III	Günter Haiden	SPÖ	October 1, 1976
Kreisky IV	Günter Haiden	SPÖ	June 5, 1979
Sinowatz	Günter Haiden	SPÖ	May 24, 1983
Vranitzky I	Erich Schmidt	SPÖ	June 16, 1986
Vranitzky II	Josef Riegler	ÖVP	January 21, 1987
Vranitzky II	Franz Fischler	ÖVP	April 24, 1989
Vranitzky III	Franz Fischler	ÖVP	December 17, 1990
Vranitzky III	Jürgen Weiss (interim)	ÖVP	November 17, 1994
Vranitzky IV	Wilhelm Molterer	ÖVP	November 29, 1994
Vranitzky V	Wilhelm Molterer	ÖVP	March 12, 1996
Klima	Wilhelm Molterer	ÖVP	January 28, 1997
Schüssel I	February 4, 2000		
Ministry of Agriculture, Forestry, Environment and Water Management; Bundesministerium für Land- und Forstwirtschaft, Umwelt und Wasserwirtschaft
Cabinet:	Minister:	Party:	Date appointed:
Schüssel I	Wilhelm Molterer	ÖVP	April 1, 2000
Schüssel II	Josef Pröll	ÖVP	February 28, 2003
Gusenbauer	Josef Pröll	ÖVP	January 11, 2007
Faymann I	Nikolaus Berlakovich	ÖVP	December 2, 2008
Faymann II	Andrä Rupprechter	ÖVP	December 16, 2013
Kern	Andrä Rupprechter	ÖVP	May 17, 2016
Kurz I	Elisabeth Köstinger	ÖVP	December 18, 2017
Ministry of Sustainability and Tourism; Bundesministerium für Nachhaltigkeit und Tourismus
Cabinet:	Minister:	Party:	Date appointed:
Kurz I	Elisabeth Köstinger	ÖVP	January 8, 2017
Bierlein	Maria Patek	Ind	June 3, 2019
Kurz II	Elisabeth Köstinger	ÖVP	January 7, 2020
Ministry of Agriculture, Regions and Tourism; Bundesministerium für Landwirtschaft, Regionen und Tourismus
Cabinet:	Minister:	Party:	Date appointed:
Kurz II	Elisabeth Köstinger	ÖVP	January 29, 2020
