= Rust im Tullnerfeld =

Coordinates: 48°18′N 15°55′E

Rust im Tullnerfeld is located in Michelhausen, Tulln District, Lower Austria (Niederösterreich). It is the birthplace of Leopold Figl and home to the museum honoring him.
