= Elisabeth Köstinger =

Austrian politician (born 1978)

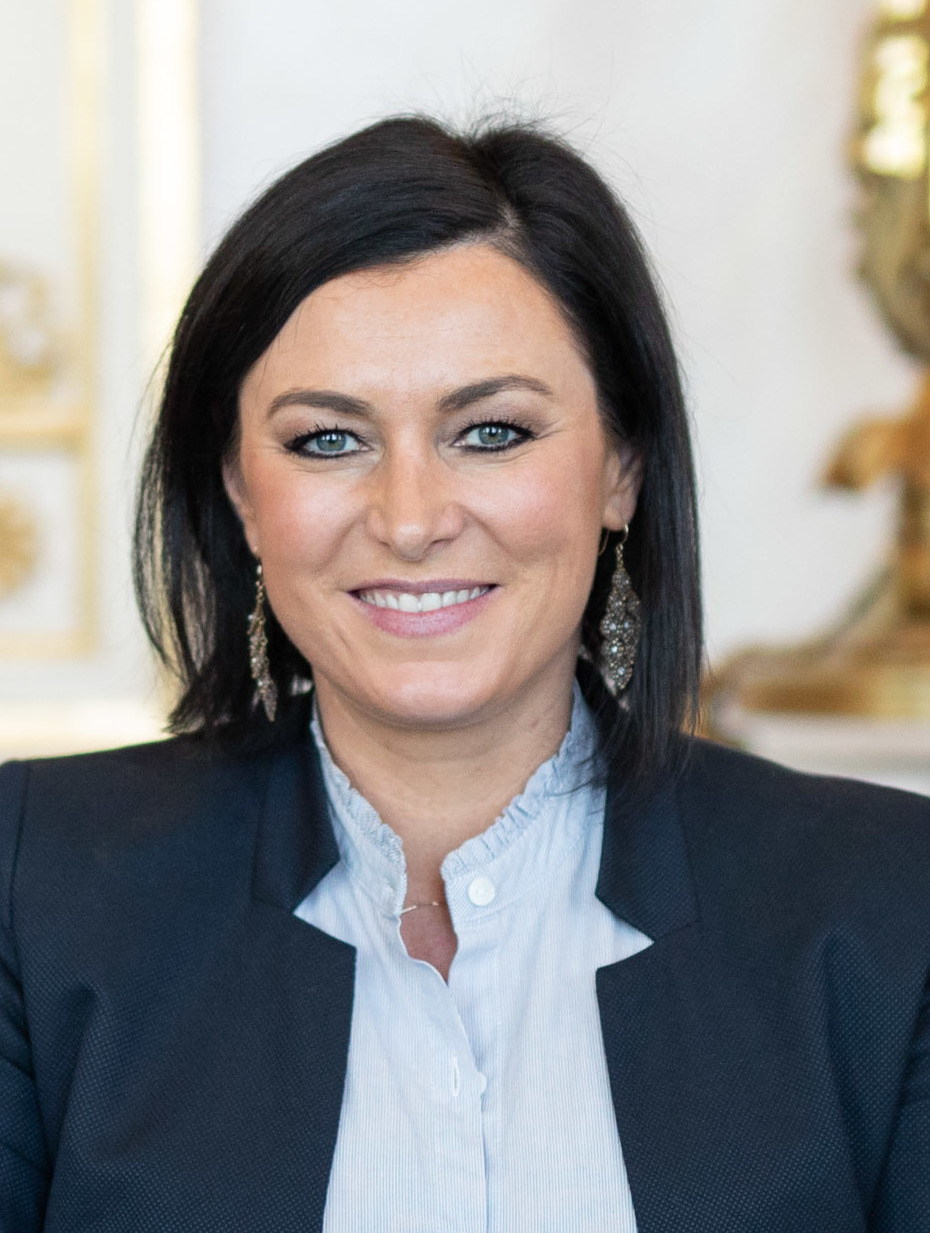
- Köstinger in 2020

Minister of Agriculture, Regions, and Tourism
- In office 7 January 2020 – 18 May 2022
- Chancellor: Sebastian Kurz; Alexander Schallenberg; Karl Nehammer
- Preceded by: Maria Patek
- Succeeded by: Norbert Totschnig
- In office 18 December 2017 – 3 June 2019
- Chancellor: Sebastian Kurz
- Preceded by: Andrä Rupprechter
- Succeeded by: Maria Patek

President of the National Council
- In office 9 November 2017 – 18 December 2017
- Preceded by: Doris Bures
- Succeeded by: Wolfgang Sobotka

Member of the European Parliament
- In office 14 July 2009 – 8 November 2017
- Affiliation: EPP Group
- Constituency: Austria

Personal details
- Born: 22 November 1978 (age 47) Wolfsberg, Carinthia, Austria
- Party: People's Party

Elisabeth Köstinger (born 22 November 1978) is an Austrian politician who served as Minister for Agriculture, Sustainability and Tourism in the government of Chancellors Sebastian Kurz, Alexander Schallenberg, and Karl Nehammer from 7 January 2020. She had served in this capacity previously from December 2017 until June 2019. She is a member of the Austrian People's Party, part of the European People's Party.

From 9 November 2017 to 18 December 2017, Köstinger briefly served as President of Austria's National Council; as secretary general of the Austrian People's Party from May 2017 to January 2018.

Elisabeth Köstinger had become a Member of the European Parliament (MEP) from Austria in 2009 under OeVP delegation leader Ernst Strasser. Reelected in 2014 under Othmar Karas Köstinger resigned as MEP in late 2017 to become minister.

== Education and career ==
- Freelance professional - communication sector (2003-2009)
- Assisted at the Kärnten District Health Insurance Fund (1999-2003)
- Studied journalism, communication and applied cultural studies at the University of Klagenfurt (2003) - Köstinger did not finish her studies due to her commitments as MEP
- HBLA (College for Occupation in Service Industries Management) in Wolfsberg, Carinthia (1994-1998)
- Secondary School in St. Paul, Carinthia (1990-1994)
- Primary School in Granitztal (1986-1990)
- Completed the AufZaQ course of the Austrian Rural Youth Organisation
- Completed the EDUCA course of the Austrian Young Farmers' Organisation

== Political career ==
=== Early beginnings ===
At the national level Köstinger is a member of the Austrian People's Party (ÖVP), where she held a number of positions early in her career:

- Head, Granitztal local group of the Rural Youth Organisation (1995-1997)
- District head, Wolfsberg section of the Rural Youth Organisation (1997-2001)
- Regional head, Kärnten section of the Rural Youth Organisation (2001-2002)
- Federal head, Austrian Rural Youth Organisation (2002-2006)
- Delegate of the Austrian Rural Youth Organisation to the European Council of Young Farmers – CEJA (2003-2005)

=== Member of the European Parliament, 2009–2017 ===
Köstinger was first elected a Member of the European Parliament since the 2009 European elections and was re-elected during the 2014 European Parliament election. From 2011 Köstinger served as vice-chair and general manager of the Austrian People’s Party Delegation in the European Parliament. She sat on the Committee on Agriculture and Rural Development (AGRI) and the Committee on Women's Rights and Gender Equality (FEMM). Köstinger is also a substitute and vice spokeswoman of the European People's Party (EPP) of the Committee on Environment, Public Health and Food Safety (ENVI).

In addition to her committee assignments, Köstinger was vice-chair of the Delegation to the EU-Armenia, EU-Azerbaijan and EU-Georgia Parliamentary Cooperation Committees, a member of the Delegation to the Euronest Parliamentary Assembly and also a substitute for the Delegation to the ACP–EU Joint Parliamentary Assembly.

=== Minister of Agriculture and Forestry ===
On 18 December Köstinger was appointed Federal Minister of Agriculture and Forestry, the Environment and Water Management by the current President of Austria Alexander Van der Bellen; with changes to areas of responsibility in several ministries that went into effect on 8 January 2018 she became the Federal Minister for Sustainability and Tourism. In this capacity, she also co-chaired the European People's Party's Environment Ministers Meeting.

Köstinger's climate-protection policies have been criticized repeatedly for lacking ambition by the scientific community and environmental protection groups alike.

In May 2022, Köstinger announced her resignation from government, saying she intends to quit politics and go into the private sector.

In February 2025 the Austrian Court of Audit criticized the implementation of the "very large budget volume" forest fund launched under Köstinger in 2020.

=== Role in national politics ===
- Federal head, Austrian Young Farmers' Association (2007-2012)
- Vice-chair of the Austrian Farmers' Federation (since 2009)
- President of ‘wald.zeit Österreich’ (since 2012)
- President of the Ecosocial Forum Europe (since 2014)
- Vice-chair of the Political Academy of the Austrian People's Party (since 2015)
- Secretary general of the Austrian People’s Party (since May 2017)

== Other activities ==
- Ryanair, Non-Executive Member of the Board of Directors (since 2023)

== Recognition ==
On 18 March 2014, Köstinger received the MEP Award in the category Agriculture and Rural Development. The award recognizes the exemplary manner in which she conducted herself as shadow rapporteur during negotiations leading to the reform of the Common Agricultural Policy (CAP).

== Personal life ==
Köstinger is unmarried and lives in St. Paul, Carinthia. In July 2018 she gave birth to a son.
