= Eduard Hartmann =

Eduard Hartmann may refer to:

- Eduard Hartmann (ice hockey) (born 1965), Slovak ice hockey player and coach
- Eduard von Hartmann (1842−1906), German philosopher
- Eduard Hartmann (politician) (1904−1966), Austrian politician

== See also ==
- Edward Hartman (disambiguation)
