= Edward Hartman (disambiguation) =

Edward Hartman is a murderer.

Edward Hartman may also refer to:

- Edward Hartman (boxer)
- Edward Hartman, performer in Stump and Stumpy

== See also ==
- Eduard Hartmann (disambiguation)
