= Johann Steinböck =

Austrian politician (1894–1962)

Governor of Lower Austria
- In office 5 May 1949 – 14 January 1962
- Preceded by: Josef Reither
- Succeeded by: Leopold Figl

Personal details
- Born: 12 June 1894; Frauenhofen bei Horn, Austria-Hungary
- Died: 14 January 1962; Vienna, Austria
- Political party: Austrian People's Party

Johann Steinböck (12 June 1894 – 14 January 1962) was an Austrian politician and Governor of Lower Austria from 1949 until his death in 1962.

== See also ==
- List of governors of Lower Austria
