= Langenrohr =

- Municipality
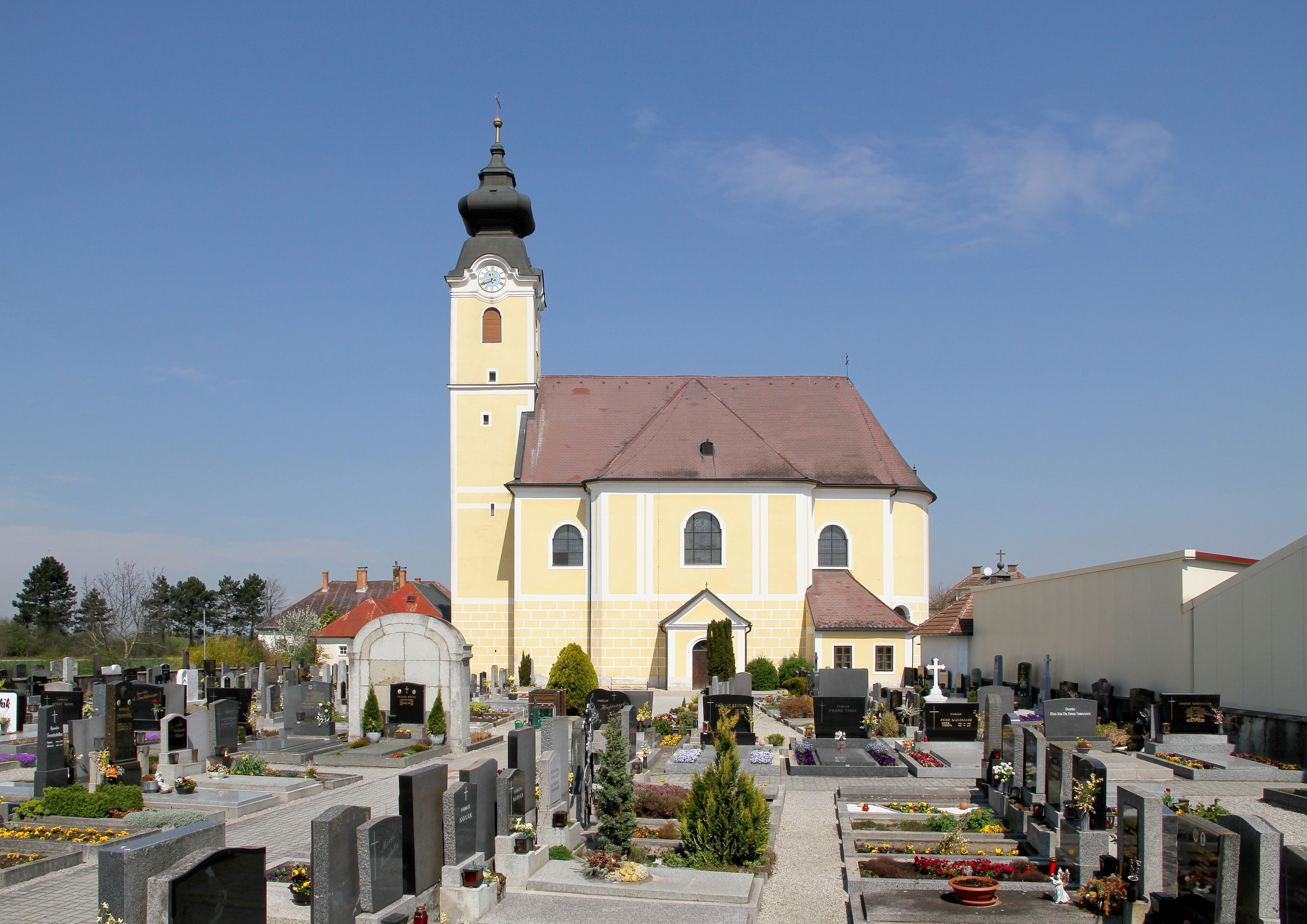

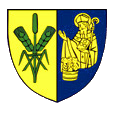
- Coat of arms

- Location within Austria
- Coordinates: 48°18′00″N 16°00′00″E
- Country: Austria
- State: Lower Austria
- District: Tulln

Government
  - Mayor: Leopold Figl (ÖVP)

Area
  - Total: 22.58 km^{2} (8.72 sq mi)
- Elevation: 182 m (597 ft)

Population (2018-01-01)
  - Total: 2,369
  - Density: 104.9/km^{2} (271.7/sq mi)
- Time zone: UTC+1 (CET)
  - Summer (DST): UTC+2 (CEST)
- Postal code: 3442
- Area code: 02272
- Vehicle registration: TU
- Website: www.langenrohr.gv.at

Langenrohr is a municipality in the district of Tulln in Lower Austria, Austria. The municipality has 2309 inhabitants as of 1 January 2013.

== Geography ==
Langenrohr lies at the great Tulln in the district of Tulln in Lower Austria. The municipality lies near the city Tulln. Langenrohr is 22,57 square kilometres big, and 17,87% is forested. Cadastral community's are Asparn, Kronau, Langenrohr, Langenschönbichl and Neusiedl.

== History ==
The municipality shared the eventful history of Austria.

=== Population ===
After the Census of 1971, in Langenrohr were 1148 inhabitants, in 1981 there were 1521 inhabitants, in 1991 there were 1674 inhabitants and in 2001 there were 1974 inhabitants.

Historical population
Year	Pop.	±%
1971	1,148	—
1981	1,521	+32.5%
1991	1,674	+10.1%
2001	2,000	+19.5%

=== Sights ===
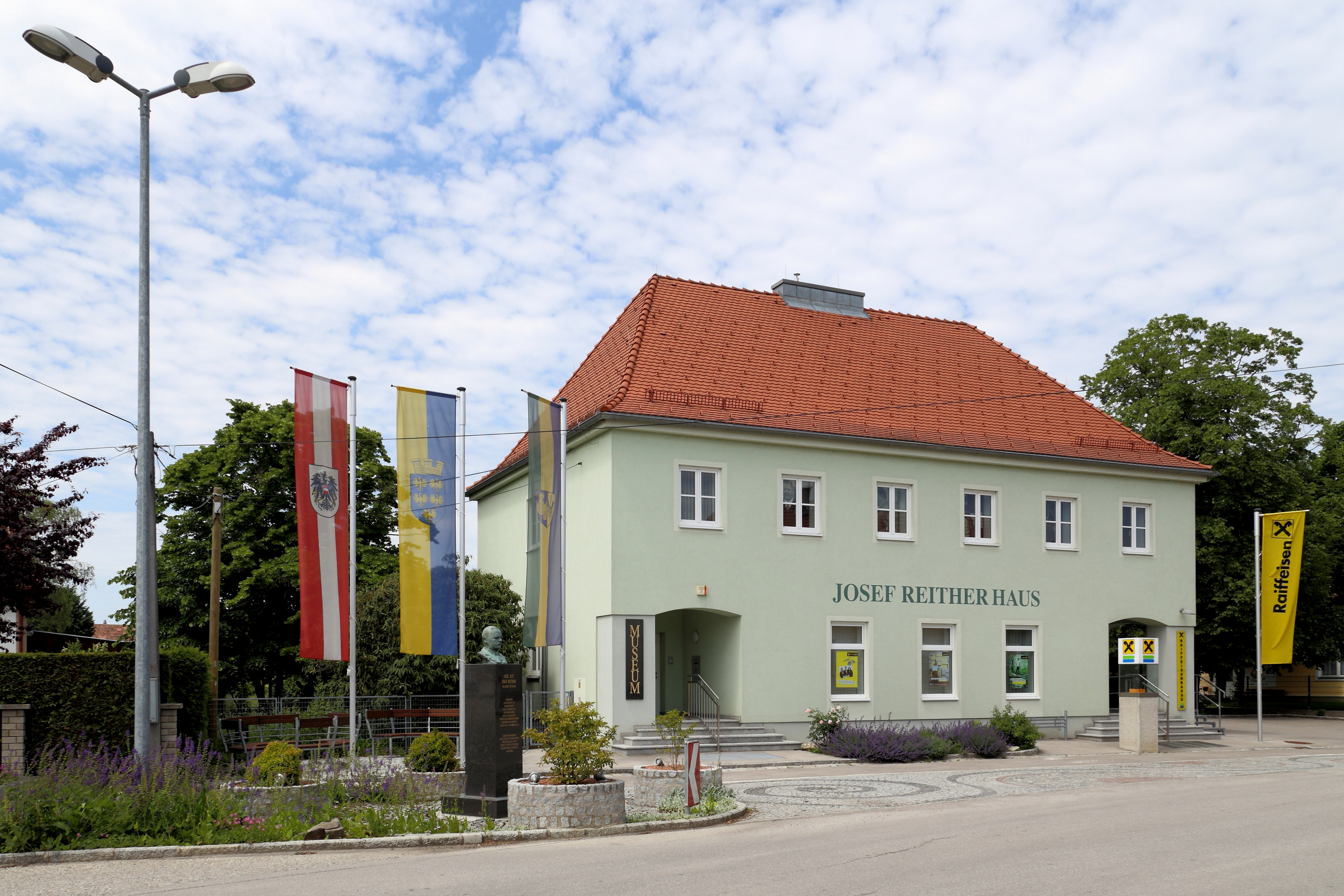
Josef Reither Museum Langenrohr exterior

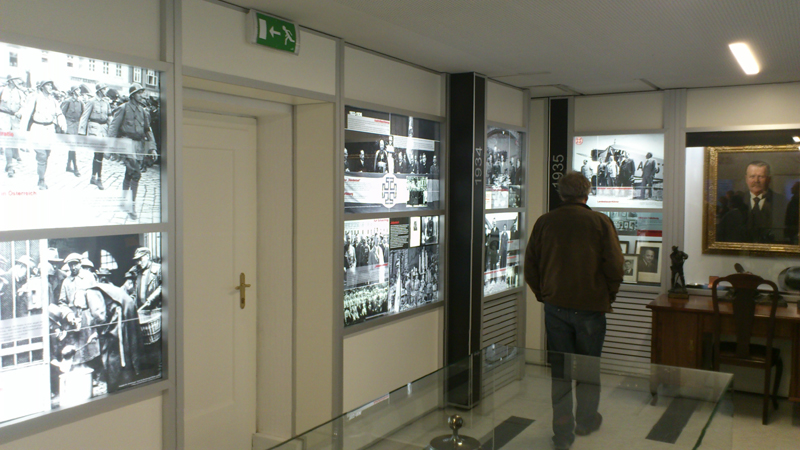
Josef Reither Museum Langenrohr interior

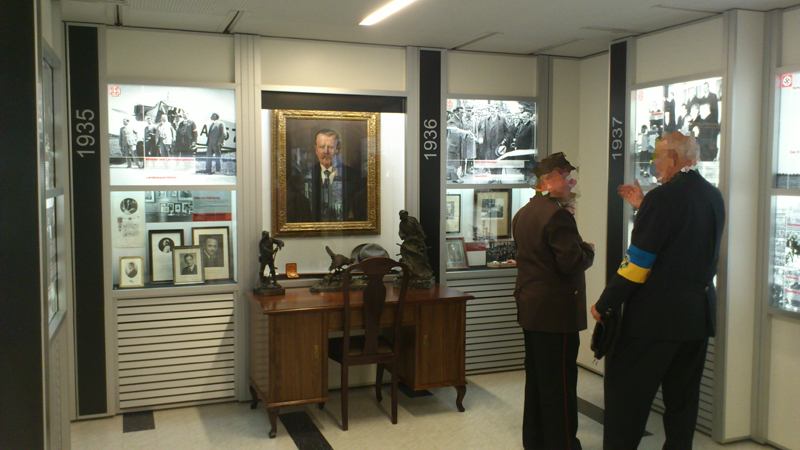
Josef Reither Museum Langenrohr interior

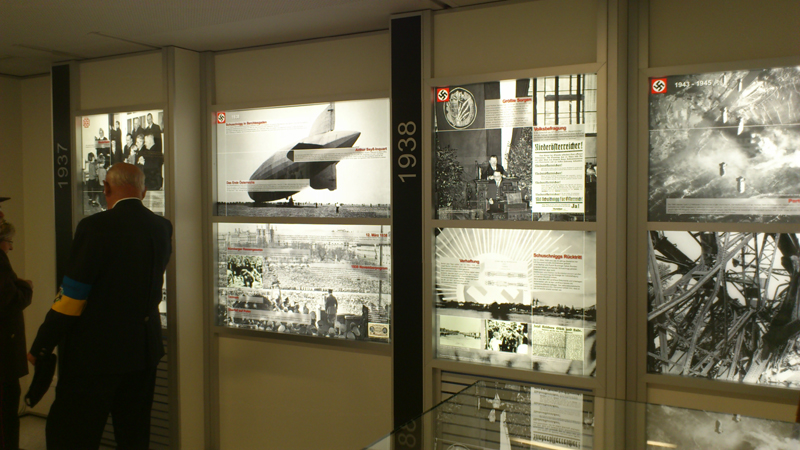
Josef Reither Museum Langenrohr interior

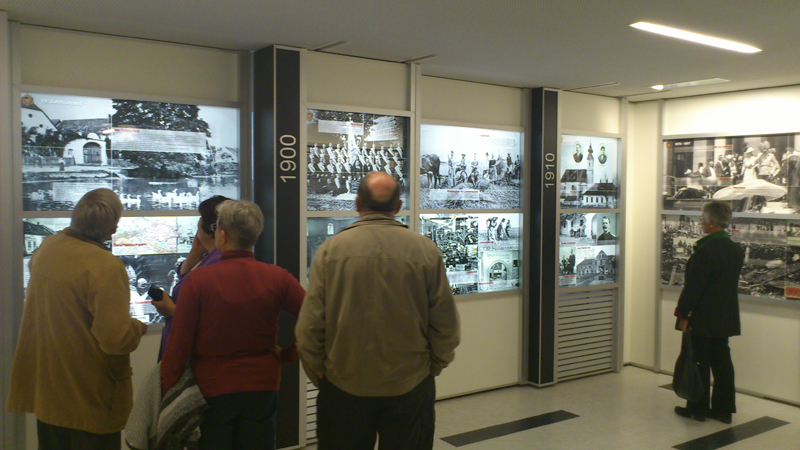
Josef Reither Museum Langenrohr interior

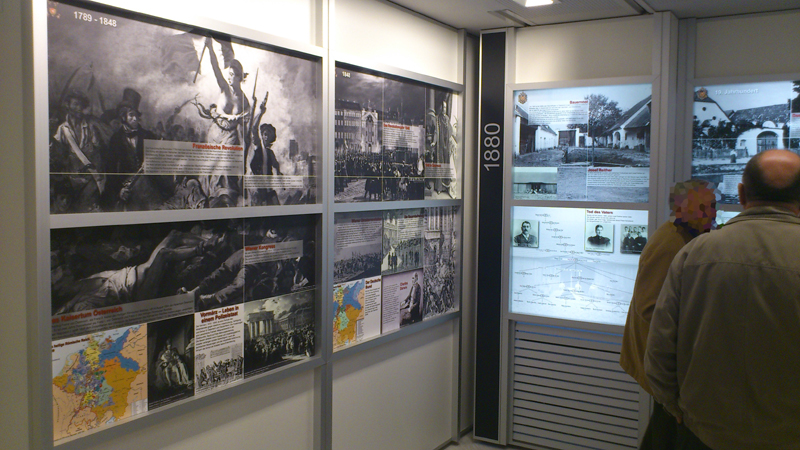
Josef Reither Museum Langenrohr interior

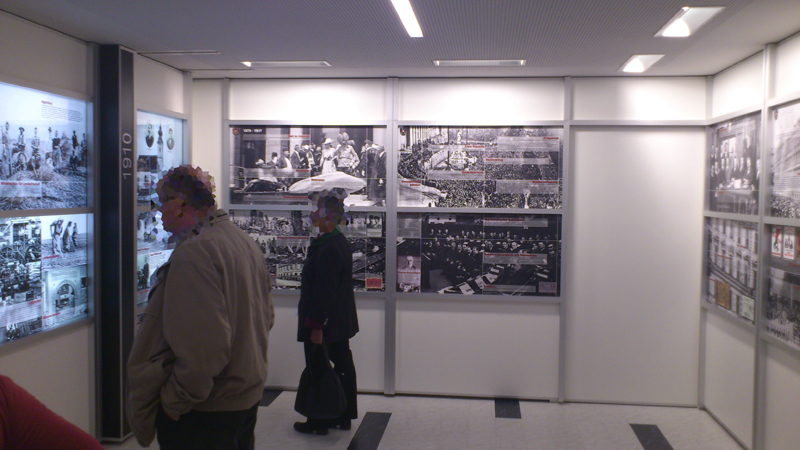
Josef Reither Museum Langenrohr interior

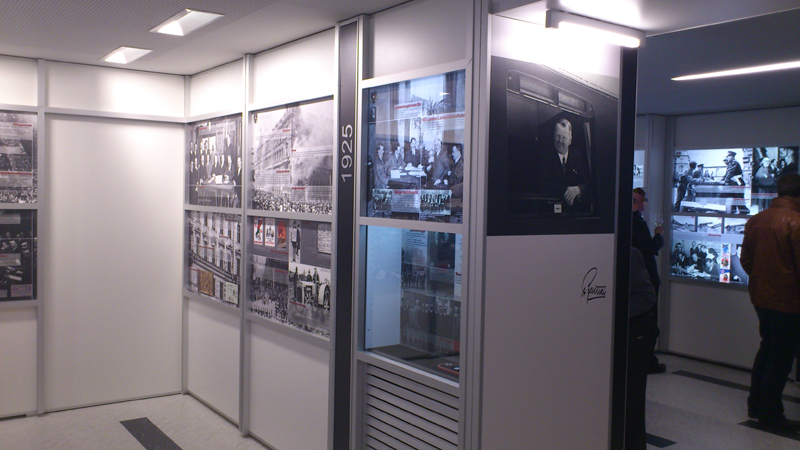
Josef Reither Museum Langenrohr interior

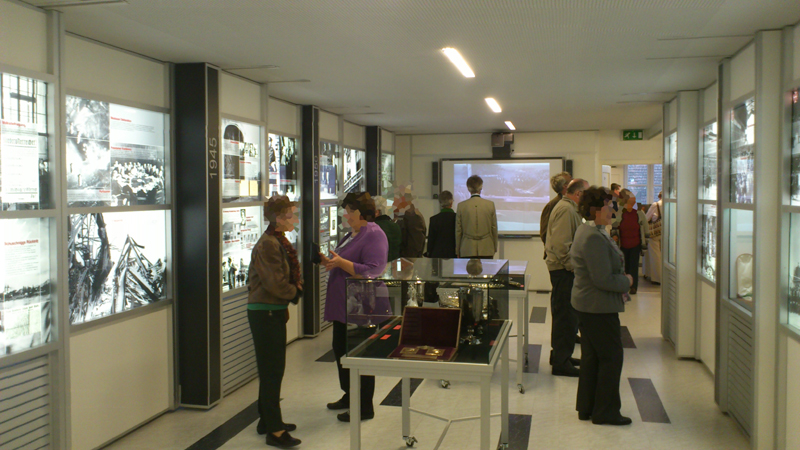
Josef Reither Museum Langenrohr interior

== Politics ==
Mayor of Langenrohr is actually Leopold Figl. In the local Market council there are after the local elections in 2010 with a total of 19 seats following distribution of seats: ÖVP 15 seats, SPÖ 2 seats, FPÖ 2 seats and the others do not have a seat.

== Sports ==
In Langenrohr is the football Club SV Langenrohr located. The club was 1947 founded and plays since 1993 in the Landesliga Niederösterreich. That's the 4th highest football League in Austria and the highest League of Lower Austria.

== Notable citizens ==
- Josef Reither (1880-1950), politician
