= Maria Patek =

Austrian civil servant (born 1958)

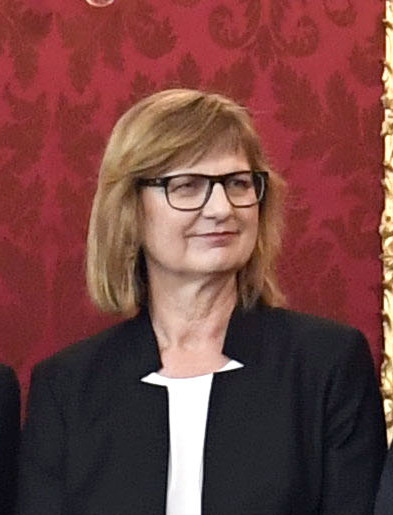

Minister of Sustainability and Tourism
- In office 3 June 2019 – 6 January 2020
- Chancellor: Brigitte Bierlein
- Preceded by: Elisabeth Köstinger
- Succeeded by: Elisabeth Köstinger

Maria Patek (born 13 July 1958) is an Austrian civil servant who served as the minister for Sustainability and Tourism in the Bierlein government.

== Life ==
Maria Patek was born in 1958 in rural Michaelerberg, Styria. Her career in the Austrian agriculture ministry began in 1983. She rose through the ranks and was responsible for the Forestry and Sustainability Section in 2018. She is married with two daughters.

In 2015 Patek was awarded a Grand Decoration of Honour in Silver for Services to the Republic of Austria. She was sworn in as Minister for Sustainability and Tourism in the interim government of Brigitte Bierlein on 3 June 2019.
