= Josef Reither =

Austrian politician (1880–1950)

Governor of Lower Austria
- In office 12 December 1945 – 2 May 1949
- Preceded by: Leopold Figl
- Succeeded by: Johann Steinböck

Personal details
- Born: 26 June 1880; Langenrohr, Austria-Hungary
- Died: 30 April 1950; Tulln an der Donau, Austria
- Political party: Austrian People's Party

Josef Reither (26 June 1880, Langenrohr, Austria – 30 April 1950, Tulln, Austria) was an Austrian politician and Governor of Lower Austria from 1931 to 1932, from 1933 until 1938 and again from 1945 until 1949.

== See also ==
- List of governors of Lower Austria
