= Vlasatice =

- Municipality
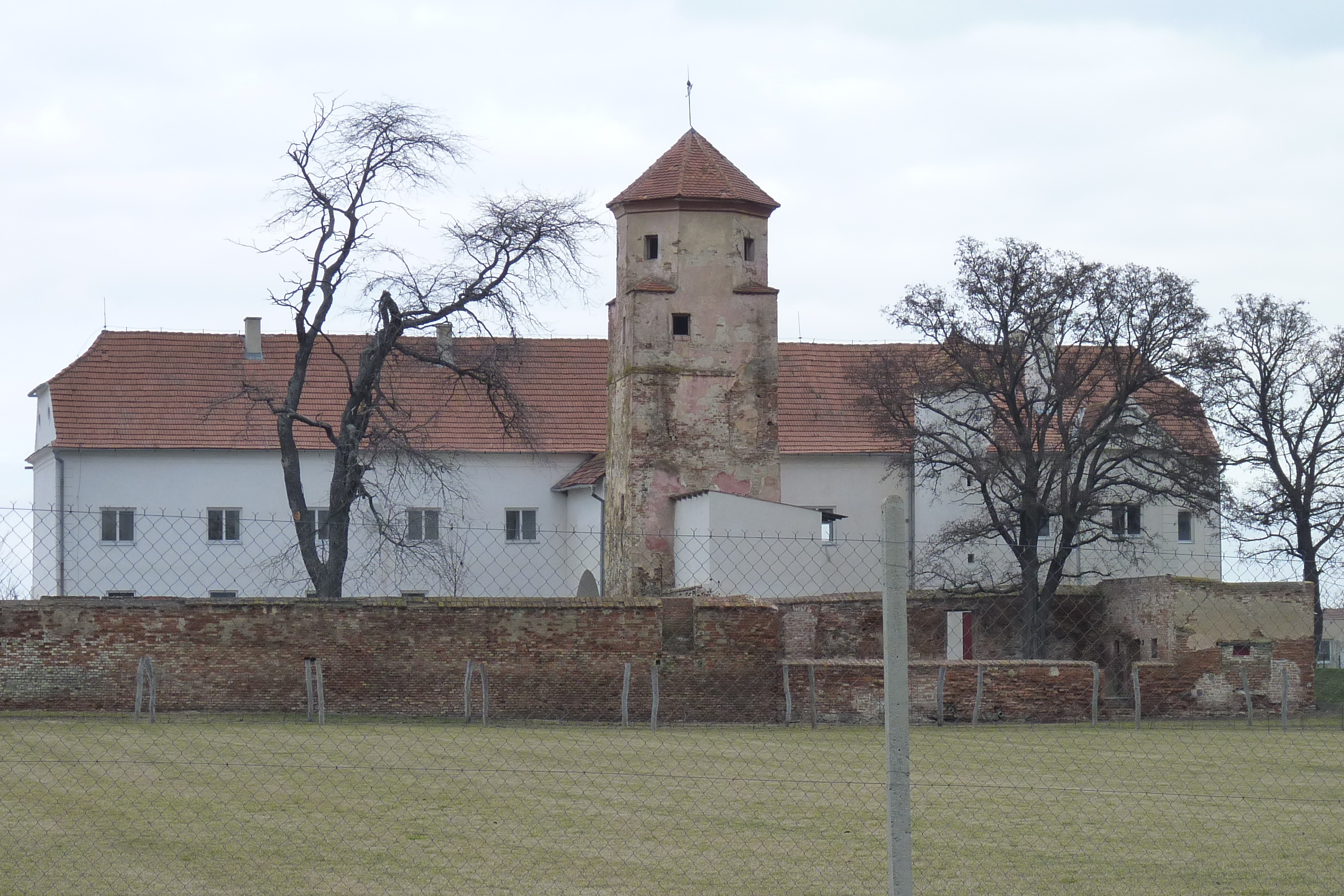
- Vlasatice Castle

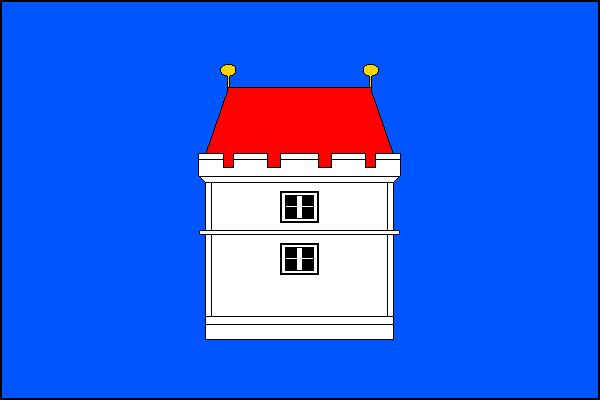
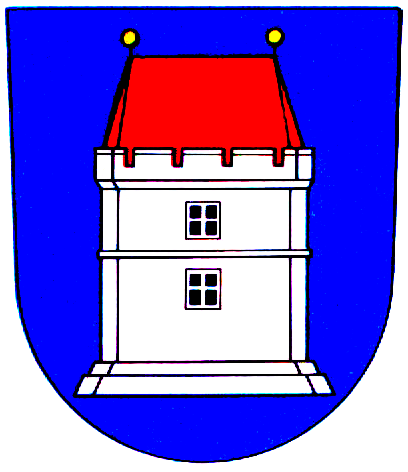
- Flag Coat of arms

- Location in the Czech Republic
- Coordinates: 48°56′2″N 16°29′4″E
- Country: Czech Republic
- Region: South Moravian
- District: Brno-Country
- First mentioned: 1276

Area
  - Total: 22.87 km^{2} (8.83 sq mi)
- Elevation: 183 m (600 ft)

Population (2026-01-01)
  - Total: 978
  - Density: 42.8/km^{2} (111/sq mi)
- Time zone: UTC+1 (CET)
  - Summer (DST): UTC+2 (CEST)
- Postal codes: 691 30
- Website: www.vlasatice.cz

Vlasatice (German: Wostitz) is a municipality and village in Brno-Country District in the South Moravian Region of the Czech Republic. It has about 1,000 inhabitants.

== Geography ==
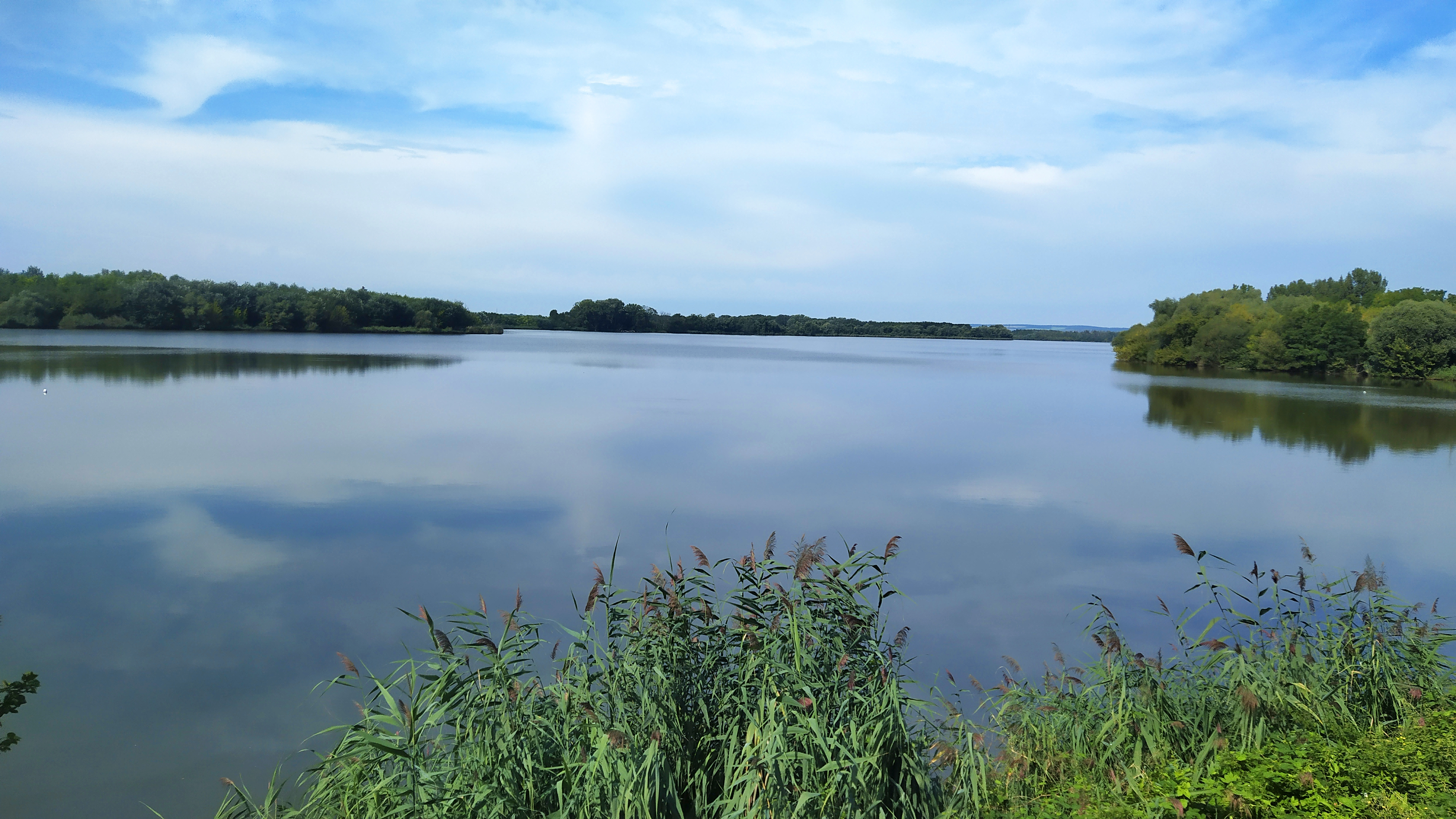
Novoveský rybník

Vlasatice is located about 29 kilometres (18 mi) south of Brno. It lies in the central part of the Dyje–Svratka Valley. The municipality is situated at the confluence of the streams Miroslavka and Olbramovický potok. In the municipal territory is the fishpond Novoveský rybník, which is the largest pond in Moravia. The second large pond in Vlasatice is Křížový rybník.

== History ==
The first written mention of Vlasatice is from 1276, when it was called Wassaticz. The Czech name Vlasatice was first used in 1437. In the 17th century, the German name Wastitz (later modified to Wostitz) was used.

In 1276, the settlement of Vlasatice was in possession of the monastery of Rosa coeli in Dolní Kounice. In 1342, Vlasatice was donated by Margrave of Moravia Charles IV to a lesser nobleman named Ditlin. In 1342, the village also gained the right to conduct trials and executions.

During the Hussite Wars in 1424, Vlasatice was conquered and occupied by Hussites. As the next owner of the village was mentioned Hanuš Hanůšek of Vlasatice in 1446. His descendants sold it to the monastery in Dolní Kounice which held it until 1527, when it was burned down. In 1537, Ferdinand I sold the whole estate to the Žabka of Limberk family and promoted Vlasatice to a market town. From 1572 to 1574, it was owned by Jan Šembera of Boskovice and in 1574, it was acquired by the Counts of Thurn-Valsassina. During the 16th century, the majority of the population switched to Lutheranism.

During the Thirty Years' War in 1619, Vlasatice was burned down by troops under the leadership of Henri Duval. After the war, almost a third of the houses remained abandoned and it became a village again. After the war, the whole region was re-settled by a German-speaking population and re-Catholicised. In 1622, Vlasatice was confiscated from Count Thurn and given to Cardinal Franz von Dietrichstein. Vlasatice remained in possession of the Dietrichstein family until 1923.

In 1938, Vlasatice was annexed by Nazi Germany and administered as part of the Reichsgau Niederdonau. After the end of World War II, it was returned to Czechoslovakia. In 1946, the German-speaking majority was expelled as a result of the Beneš decrees. Vlasatice was repopulated with ethnic Czechs who came mostly from Volhynia, Hungary and Slovakia, but also from Poland, France and Argentina.

== Demographics ==
Historical population

Year	Pop.	±%
1869	1,748	—
1880	2,060	+17.8%
1890	1,932	−6.2%
1900	1,907	−1.3%
1910	2,035	+6.7%

Year	Pop.	±%
1921	2,021	−0.7%
1930	1,926	−4.7%
1950	988	−48.7%
1961	974	−1.4%
1970	963	−1.1%

Year	Pop.	±%
1980	947	−1.7%
1991	870	−8.1%
2001	807	−7.2%
2011	785	−2.7%
2021	870	+10.8%

Source: Censuses

== Transport ==
There are no railways or major roads passing through the municipality.

== Sights ==
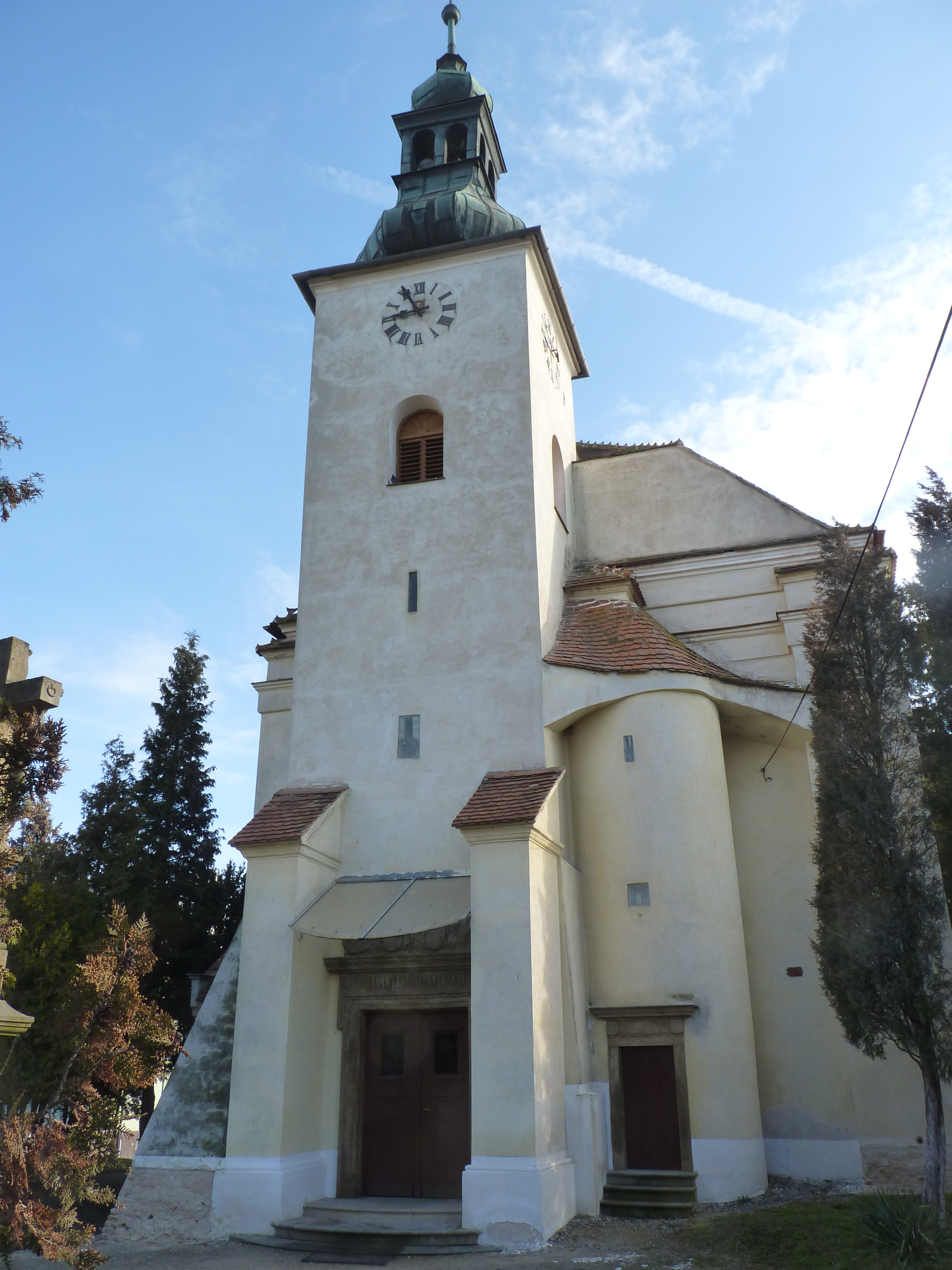
Church of Saint John the Baptist

The main landmark of Vlasatice is the Church of Saint John the Baptist. It was originally an Evangelic church, built in 1610 on the site of an older church. In 1829, the Chapel of the Corpus Christi was added to the church.

The Vlasatice Castle was originally a small residence of the lower nobility. In the mid-16th century it was rebuilt into a Renaissance castle in the style of Italian villa. In the mid-18th century, it was modified in the Baroque style. Under the Dietrichsteins, the importance of the castle declined, and it was used as offices and flats. Today it has private owners and is inaccessible to the public.

== Notable people ==
- Siegfried Ludwig (1926–2013), Austrian politician
