= 1973 in Austria =

- Decades: 1950s; 1960s; 1970s; 1980s; 1990s
- See also: Other events of 1973; List of years in Austria

Events from the year 1973 in Austria.

== Incumbents ==
- President – Franz Jonas
- Chancellor – Bruno Kreisky

== Births ==
- 25 March – Michaela Dorfmeister, alpine skier
- 26 April – Stephanie Graf, athlete
- 13 May – Reinhold Einwallner, politician

== Deaths ==
- 29 September – W. H. Auden, British-American poet (born 1973 in England)
