= Sophie Schulz =

Austrian politician (1905–1975)

Member of the Landtag of Lower Austria
- In office 5 November 1959 – 19 November 1964
- Preceded by: Viktor Müllner

Member of the Baden City Council
- In office 1955–1965

Personal details
- Born: Sophie Rotteneder; 23 May 1905
- Died: 24 April 1975 (aged 69) Baden bei Wien, Lower Austria, Austria
- Party: Christian Social Party (c. 1930); Austrian People's Party (c. 1950–1975)
- Spouse: Herr Schulz

Sophie Schulz (née Rotteneder; 23 May 1905 – 24 April 1975) was an Austrian politician who served in the Landtag of Lower Austria from 1959 until 1965 as a member of the Austrian People's Party. During her tenure, she introduced revised regulations for the state's spas and health resorts.

== Biography ==
Sophie Schulz (née Rotteneder) was born on 23 May 1905. A resident of Baden bei Wien, she was a member of the Christian Social Party during the Interwar period. After the war, she joined the Austrian People's Party. Schulz was elected a local councilor in 1950, and served as a member of the Baden city council from 1955 until 1965. Prior to entering politics, she was a housewife.

On 5 November 1959, Schulz became a member of the Landtag of Lower Austria, succeeding Viktor Müllner. During her tenure, she introduced a bill which would update regulations to the state's spas and health resorts, superseding a 1930 law which had become redundant due to scientific advances in balneology. Specifically, the law clarifies when a spa can be considered a health resort, prevents towns without spas from calling themselves spa towns, and establishes construction and sanitation regulations. Schulz left the landtag at the end of her term on 19 November 1964.

Schulz died in Baden on 24 April 1975.
