= Trautmannsdorf an der Leitha =

- Municipality
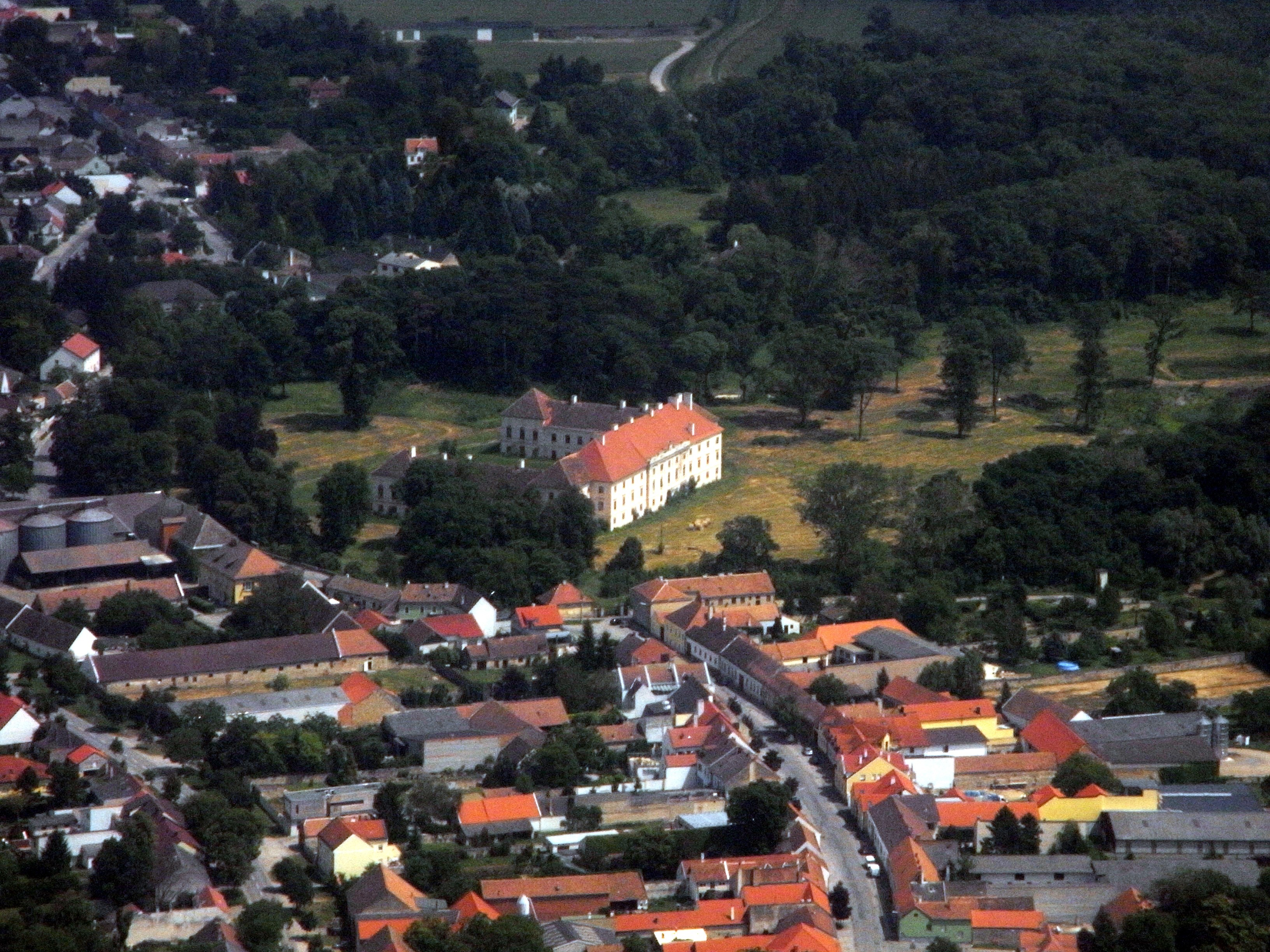
- View of Trautmannsdorf

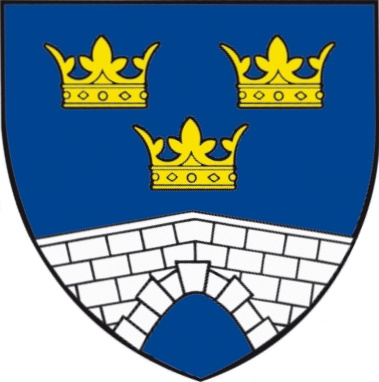
- Coat of arms

- Location within Austria
- Coordinates: 48°1′N 16°37′E
- Country: Austria
- State: Lower Austria
- District: Bruck an der Leitha

Government
  - Mayor: Johann Laa

Area
  - Total: 35.44 km^{2} (13.68 sq mi)
- Elevation: 168 m (551 ft)

Population (2018-01-01)
  - Total: 2,886
  - Density: 81.43/km^{2} (210.9/sq mi)
- Time zone: UTC+1 (CET)
  - Summer (DST): UTC+2 (CEST)
- Postal code: 2454
- Area code: 02169
- Website: www.trautmannsdorf.at

Trautmannsdorf an der Leitha is a town in the district of Bruck an der Leitha in Lower Austria in Austria.

Trautmannsdorf an der Leitha in the district of Bruck an der Leitha

== Geography ==
Trautmannsdorf an der Leitha lies in the industrial area of Lower Austria. The Leitha River crosses the municipality. It is the third-largest municipality of the district. About 9.56 percent of the municipality is forested.

The municipality contains the following villages:

- Gallbrunn (population 736 as of 1 January 2017)
- Sarasdorf (population 568 as of 1 January 2017)
- Stixneusiedl (population 580 as of 1 January 2017)
- Trautmannsdorf an der Leitha (population 979 as of 1 January 2017)
