= Eduard Hartmann (politician) =

Austrian politician (1904–1966)

Governor of Lower Austria
- In office 25 June 1965 – 14 October 1966
- Preceded by: Leopold Figl
- Succeeded by: Andreas Maurer

Minister of Agriculture and Forestry
- In office 16 July 1959 – 2 April 1964
- Preceded by: Franz Thoma
- Succeeded by: Karl Schleinzer

Personal details
- Born: 3 September 1904; Laxenburg, Austria-Hungary
- Died: 14 October 1966; Vienna, Austria
- Political party: Austrian People's Party

Eduard Hartmann (3 September 1904, Laxenburg, Austria – 14 October 1966, Vienna, Austria) was an Austrian politician and Governor of Lower Austria from 1965 until his death in 1966. He previously served as federal Minister of Agriculture and Forestry from 1959 to 1964.

== See also ==
- List of governors of Lower Austria
