= Leopold Figl =

Chancellor of Austria From 1945 to 1953

Servant of God Leopold Figl
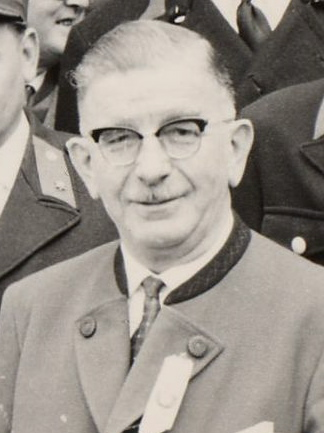
- Figl as Lower Austrian governor, c. 1962

Chancellor of Austria
- In office 20 December 1945 – 2 April 1953
- President: Karl Renner; Theodor Körner
- Vice-Chancellor: Adolf Schärf
- Preceded by: Karl Renner
- Succeeded by: Julius Raab

Vice-Chancellor of Austria
- In office 27 April 1945 – 20 December 1945 Serving with Johann Koplenig, Adolf Schärf
- Chancellor: Karl Renner
- Preceded by: Edmund Glaise-Horstenau (1938)
- Succeeded by: Adolf Schärf

Governor of Lower Austria
- In office 14 January 1962 – 9 May 1965
- Preceded by: Johann Steinböck
- Succeeded by: Eduard Hartmann
- In office 25 May 1945 – 15 October 1945
- Preceded by: Hugo Jury
- Succeeded by: Johann Steinböck

President of the National Council
- In office 9 June 1959 – 5 February 1962
- Preceded by: Felix Hurdes
- Succeeded by: Alfred Maleta

Minister of Foreign Affairs
- In office 26 November 1953 – 9 June 1959
- Chancellor: Julius Raab
- Preceded by: Karl Gruber
- Succeeded by: Bruno Kreisky

Personal details
- Born: 2 October 1902 Rust, Michelhausen, Austria, Austria-Hungary
- Died: 9 May 1965 (aged 62) Vienna, Austria
- Party: People's Party
- Education: Universität für Bodenkultur Wien

Leopold Figl (2 October 1902 – 9 May 1965) was an Austrian politician of the Austrian People's Party (ÖVP) and the first Chancellor after World War II. As foreign minister, he subsequently took part in the negotiations on the Austrian State Treaty, which he signed in 1955.

== Life ==
Born a farmer's son in the Lower Austrian village of Rust im Tullnerfeld, Figl after graduation as Dipl.-Ing. of Agriculture at the University of Natural Resources and Applied Life Sciences Vienna became vice chair of the Lower Austrian Bauernbund (Farmer's League) in 1931 and chairman in 1933. In 1930, Figl married Hilde Hemala (1906–1989) and had two children.

After the authoritarian revolution of Engelbert Dollfuss, which led to the Ständestaat dictatorship, Figl became a member of the council of economic policy and leader of the paramilitary organisation of Ostmärkische Sturmscharen in Lower Austria.

After the Anschluss, the Nazis deported Figl to Dachau concentration camp in 1938 due to his prominent position in the Ständestaat. He was released in May 1943 and subsequently worked as an oil engineer. In October 1944, he was rearrested and taken to Mauthausen concentration camp. On 21 January 1945, he was brought back to Vienna together with the later executed resistance fighter Heinrich Maier. The folder of his dossier was marked with the abbreviation 'VG' indicating that a Volksgerichtshof (People's Court) trial, often ending with a death penalty, was planned or in preparation. Figl was released on 6 April 1945, when the Soviet Army took Vienna.

During Allied-occupied Austria, the Soviet military commander, Fyodor Tolbukhin, asked Figl to manage the provision of food for the population of Vienna. On 14 April 1945 he refounded the Bauernbund and integrated it into the Austrian People's Party (ÖVP), which was founded three days later. On 27 April he became interim Governor of Lower Austria as well as co-vice chancellor of the country.

At the first free elections since 1930, held in December 1945, the ÖVP won with 49.8 percent of the vote and an absolute majority of seats in the legislature. Figl was proposed as Chancellor; the Soviets agreed, because of his opposition to the Nazis and his managerial abilities. Although he could have formed an exclusively ÖVP government, the memories of the factionalism that had plagued the First Republic led him to continue the grand coalition between the People's Party, Socialists and Communists. The coalition (from which the Communists were pushed out in 1947), remained in office until 1966 and did much to solve the serious economic and social problems left over from World War II.

After internal criticism, Figl resigned as Chancellor on 26 November 1953. His successor, Julius Raab, was less flexible towards the SPÖ, but was Chancellor when the Austrian State Treaty, which restored sovereignty to the country, was signed on 15 May 1955. However, Figl was strongly involved in its achievement, as he remained in the government as foreign minister. His appearance on the balcony of Belvedere Palace waving the signed paper and speaking the words Österreich ist frei! ("Austria is free!"), as rendered by the Wochenschau newsreel, has become an icon in the Austrian national remembrance. (The words were actually spoken before, inside the Palace, but the pictures on the balcony were underlain with the sound track made inside.)

At the national elections of 1959, the SPÖ gained ground on the ÖVP, and the ratio of seats between the two parties in parliament was now almost 1:1. This gave the SPÖ the bargaining power to demand that Bruno Kreisky succeed him as foreign minister. Figl served as president of the National Council from 1959–1962, but soon returned to Lower Austria, to become governor of his home state.

Figl was patron of the Pfadfinder Österreichs between 1960 and 1964 and president of the Scout association from 1964 until his death.

He died from kidney cancer in 1965 in Vienna, and is buried in an Ehrengrab at the Zentralfriedhof. His son Johannes was International Commissioner of the Pfadfinder Österreichs and president of the Pfadfinder und Pfadfinderinnen Österreichs from 1994 to 2000.

== Beatification ==
In December 2020, the Roman Catholic Diocese of Sankt Pölten opened his cause for beatification. He currently holds the title "Servant of God".

== Honours and awards ==
- Grand Cross of the Order of Pius IX
- Honorary Ring of Lower Austria (1952)
- Grand Gold Decoration with Sash of the Order for Services to the Republic of Austria (1954)
- Golden Commander's Cross with the Star of Honour for Services to the Province of Lower Austria

Various locations have been named for Figl:

- Leopold Figl Museum in Michelhausen in Tulln, Lower Austria
- Leopold Figl observatory on the Schöpfl (mountain in the northern Vienna Woods overlooking the Tullnerfeld, Figl's home region)
- Leopold Figl observatory on Tulbinger Kogel in Lower Austria (ditto)
- Leopold Figl court: Vienna 1, District, Franz-Josef-Kai 31-33 (Home, 1963–1967)
- Leopold Figl Lane: Vienna 1, District (next to the historic Lower Austrian House)
- Monument: Vienna 1, District Minoritenplatz (bust, 1973, between Villa and the Federal Chancellery)
- Plaques: Vienna 1, District Schenkenstraße 2 (Home, 1928–1932) and Plaque: Vienna 3, District Kundmanngasse 24 (Home, 1937–1946)

== See also ==
- List of members of the Austrian Parliament who died in office

Political offices
Preceded by: Karl Renner	Chancellor of Austria; 1945–1953	Succeeded by: Julius Raab
Preceded by: Karl Gruber	Minister of Foreign Affairs; 1953–1959	Succeeded by: Bruno Kreisky
