= Andreas Mihavecz =

Austrian who survived the longest without food or liquids

Andreas Mihavecz (born 1960 or 1961) is an Austrian man from Bregenz who holds the record of surviving the longest without any food or liquids. His ordeal is documented in the Guinness World Records.

== Background ==
On 1 April 1979, the then 18-year-old Mihavecz was mistakenly put into custody in a holding cell for being a passenger in a crashed car and completely forgotten about by the three policemen responsible for him. Each of them thought that the two others had already freed Mihavecz. They also ignored the pleas of his worried mother, who was concerned for what might have happened to her son.

As Mihavecz's cell was in the basement, nobody could hear his screams. He survived by ingesting condensed water from the walls and eventually lost 24 kg (53 pounds) of weight. Eighteen days later on 19 April, an officer who had unrelated business in the basement opened his cell after noticing the stench that was emanating from it. Mihavecz needed several weeks to regain his health.

== Trial ==
In the criminal trial that followed, the three policemen accused each other. In the end, they were fined 4000 ATS, an amount equivalent to €990 or AU$1500 in 2026, as there was no evidence of criminal neglect or who was the main culprit. Two years later, however, a civil court awarded Mihavecz 250,000 ATS (equivalent to €54,700 or AU$88,000 in 2026) in compensation.

== Legacy ==
Mihavecz's case was later included in the first edition of a German book on urban legends, as the updated form of a medieval German folk tale of the forgotten peasant in the debtors' prison.
