= Norbert Totschnig =

Austrian politician (born 1974)

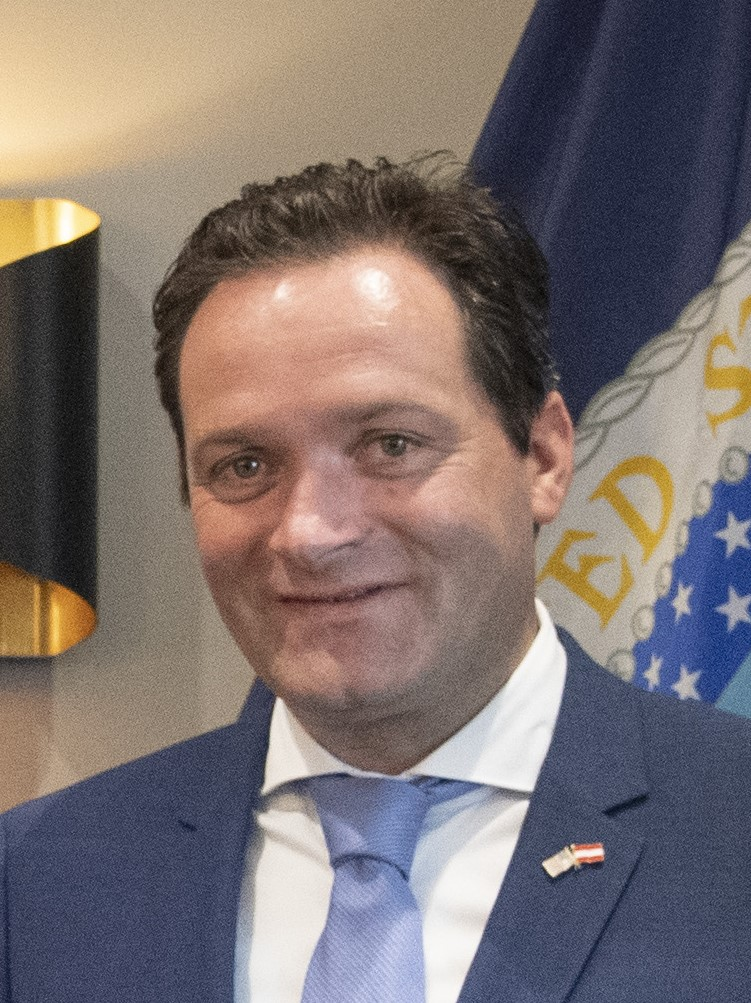
Norbert Totschnig

Norbert Totschnig (born 6 June 1974 in Lienz) is an Austrian politician serving as minister of Agriculture since May 2022. He was director of Austrian Farmers’ Association from 2017 to 2022 when he was appointed into the Karl Nehammer federal government. On 3 March 2025 Christian Stocker appointed him as Minister of Agriculture, Regions and Tourism.
