= Mirjam Jäger-Fischer =

Austrian politician (born 1977)

Mirjam Jäger-Fischer (born 18 May 1977) is an Austrian politician for the SPÖ. She has been in the Landtag of Vorarlberg since 2006 and has announced she will not be eligible for reelection in 2014. As a result, she has revoked her political career and no longer declares herself an active politician, as of 1 October 2017.
