= Michelhausen =

- Municipality
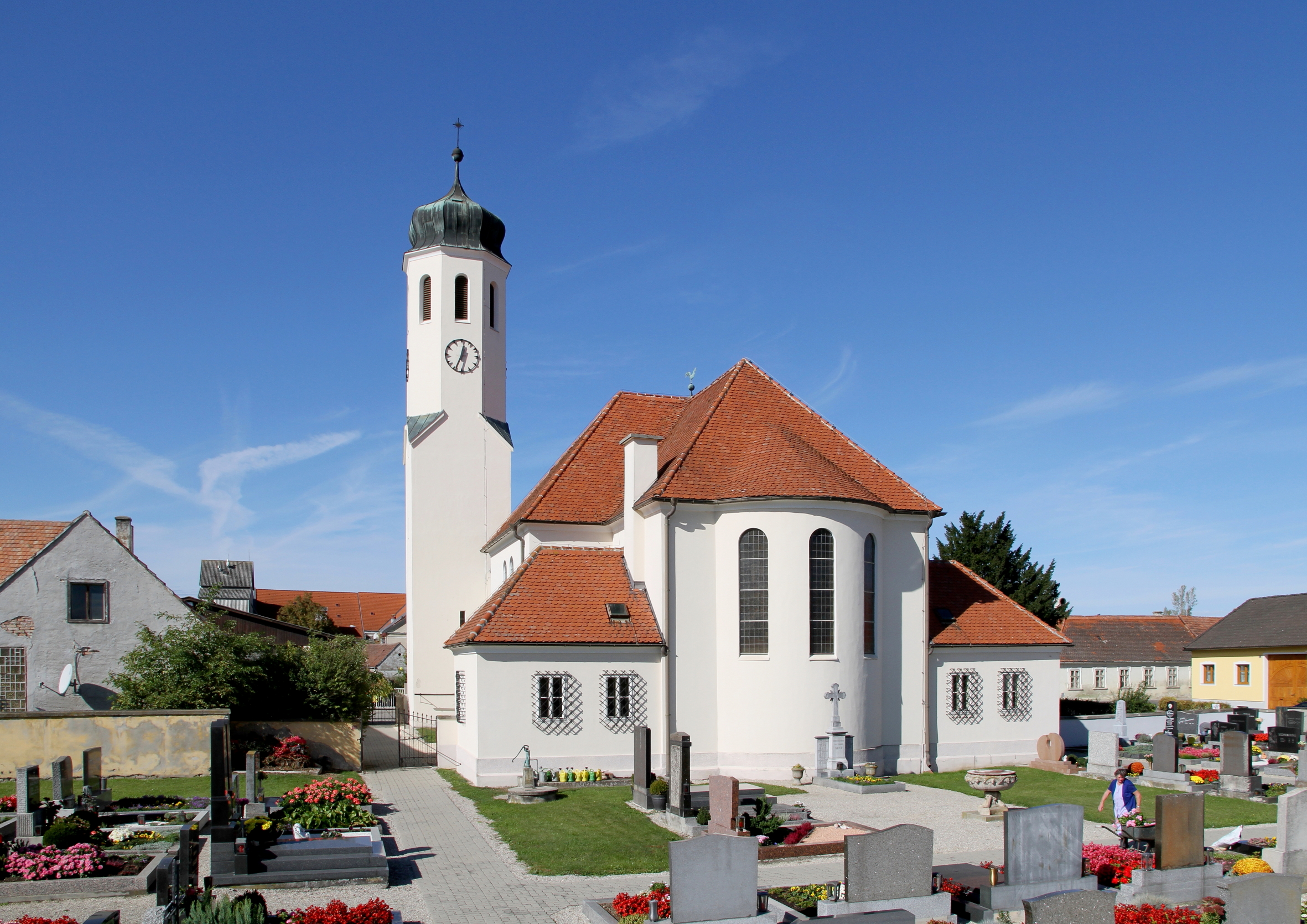
- Church of Saint Martin

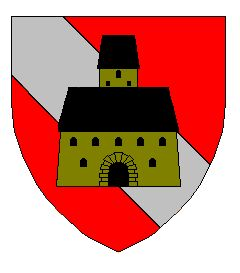
- Coat of arms

- Location within Austria
- Coordinates: 48°17′23″N 15°56′15″E
- Country: Austria
- State: Lower Austria
- District: Tulln

Government
  - Mayor: Rudolf Friewald (ÖVP)

Area
  - Total: 32.03 km^{2} (12.37 sq mi)
- Elevation: 195 m (640 ft)

Population (2018-01-01)
  - Total: 3,113
  - Density: 97.19/km^{2} (251.7/sq mi)
- Time zone: UTC+1 (CET)
  - Summer (DST): UTC+2 (CEST)
- Postal code: 3451
- Area code: 02275
- Vehicle registration: TU
- Website: www.michelhausen.at

Michelhausen is a municipality in the district of Tulln in the Austrian state of Lower Austria.

== Population ==
Historical population
Year	Pop.	±%
1971	2,066	—
1981	2,138	+3.5%
1991	2,379	+11.3%
2001	2,524	+6.1%
