= Hans Sima =

Austrian politician (1918–2006)

Hans Sima (June 4, 1918 – October 7, 2006) was an Austrian politician of the Social Democratic Party (SPÖ), serving as governor (Landeshauptmann) of Carinthia from 1965 to 1974.

Sima was born in Saifnitz, Austro-Hungarian Empire (today Camporosso, Val Canale (German: Kanaltal), Tarvisio, Province of Udine, Italy). He attended elementary school, Hauptschule, and, from 1933 to 1937, a commercial vocational school. During his schooling, he suffered 6 months' political imprisonment in 1935, under Austrofascism.

He entered the civil service of the Carinthian provincial government in 1938. He became Secretary of the Carinthian SPÖ in 1945, after the end of World War II allowed the SPÖ to resume a role in politics, and held the position until 1956. In 1949, he was elected to the Landtag of Carinthia, in which he'd serve until 1974. He became a member of the Carinthian government in 1956, deputy governor of Carinthia in 1963, and governor (Landeshauptmann) in 1965. He was forced out as governor in 1974 in favor of Leopold Wagner, amidst a controversy over bilingual German/Slovene place-name signs, in which Sima was accused of being too accommodating toward the Carinthian Slovenes.

Sima died in 2006, in Klagenfurt.
