= Siegfried Ludwig =

Austrian politician (1926–2013)

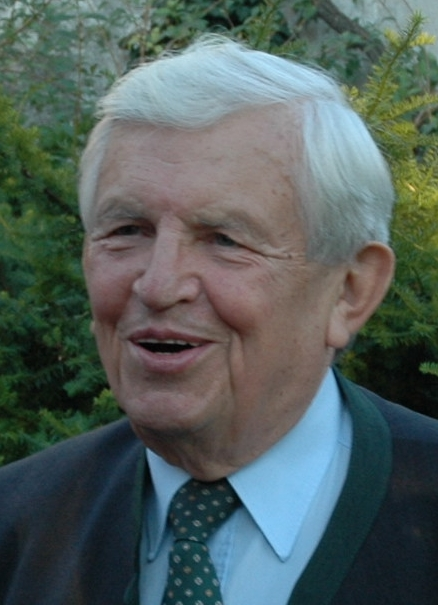
- Governor Siegfried Ludwig

Governor of Lower Austria
- In office 22 January 1981 – 22 October 1992
- Preceded by: Andreas Maurer
- Succeeded by: Erwin Pröll

Personal details
- Born: 14 February 1926 Vlastice, Czechoslovakia
- Died: 16 April 2013 (aged 87) St. Pölten, Austria
- Party: Austrian People's Party

Siegfried Ludwig (14 February 1926 – 16 April 2013) was an Austrian politician and Governor of Lower Austria from 1981 to 1992. He was born in Vlasatice, Czechoslovakia, and died at St. Pölten, Austria.

== See also ==
- List of governors of Lower Austria
