= Josef Krainer Jr. =

Austrian politician (1930–2016)

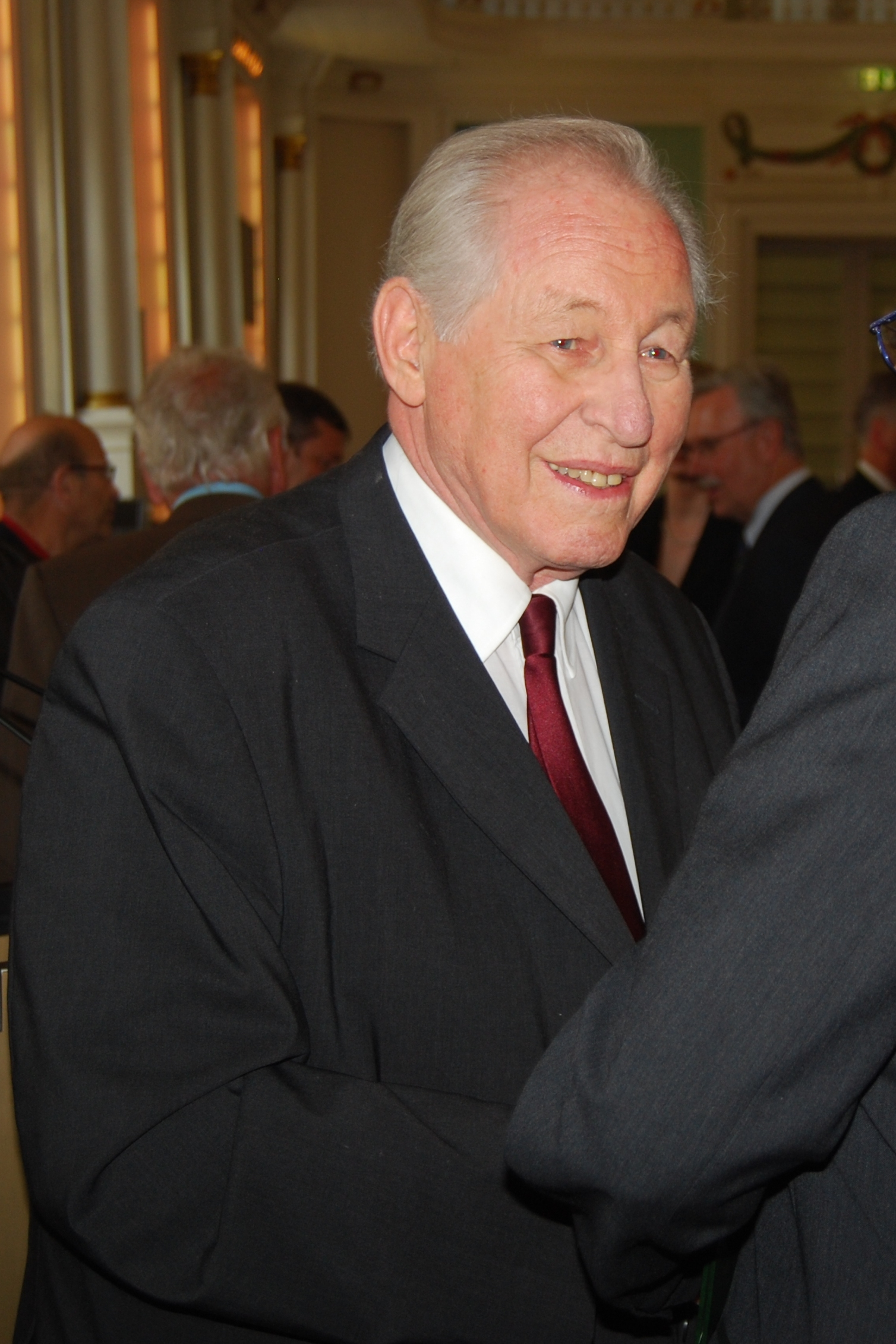

Josef Krainer junior (26 August 1930 – 30 December 2016) was an Austrian politician and Governor of Styria from 1981 to 1996. He was the son of Governor Josef Krainer Sr. and a member of the Austrian People's Party. He was born and died in Graz, Austria.

== See also ==
- List of governors of Styria
