= Andreas Maurer (Austrian politician) =

Austrian politician, governor of Lower Austria 1966–1981

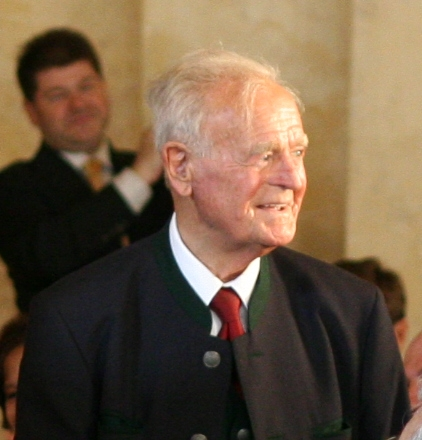
- Andreas Maurer in 2005

Governor of Lower Austria
- In office 24 November 1966 – 22 January 1981
- Preceded by: Eduard Hartmann
- Succeeded by: Siegfried Ludwig (ÖVP)

Personal details
- Born: 7 September 1919; Trautmannsdorf an der Leitha, German-Austria
- Died: 25 October 2010 (aged 91); Trautmannsdorf an der Leitha, Austria
- Political party: Austrian People's Party

Andreas Josef Maurer (7 September 1919 – 25 October 2010) was an Austrian politician (ÖVP) and farmers' advocate who served as governor of Lower Austria from 1966 to 1981.

== Early life ==
Maurer was born in Trautmannsdorf an der Leitha in Lower Austria, and was raised on his parents' farm. From 1925 to 1933 he attended school in Trautmannsdorf, and afterwards attended agricultural technical school in Bruck an der Leitha.

He was a soldier in the Wehrmacht from 1940 to 1945, and married Hermine Berger in 1944.

== Political career ==
From 1946, Maurer was politically active as a farmers' representative, and then entered local politics, serving on the Trautmannsdorf city council from 1951 to 1956. In 1959 he was elected to the Landtag of Lower Austria, where he served until 1964. From 1964 to 1966 he was an official (Landesrat) in the provincial government of Lower Austria, as well as President of the Austrian Farmers' Federation. From 1970 to 1989 he was chairman of the Lower Austrian Farmers' Federation.

From 24 November 1966 to 22 January 1981, Maurer was the Landeshauptmann (Governor) of Lower Austria. During this lengthy term, he oversaw development of the state's road system, as well as a general process of modernization. His government enacted compulsory education, a regional planning law, a nature protection law, and a new state constitution.
