= List of governors of Carinthia =

Governor of Carinthia
- Landeshauptleute von Kärnten
- Flag of Carinthia

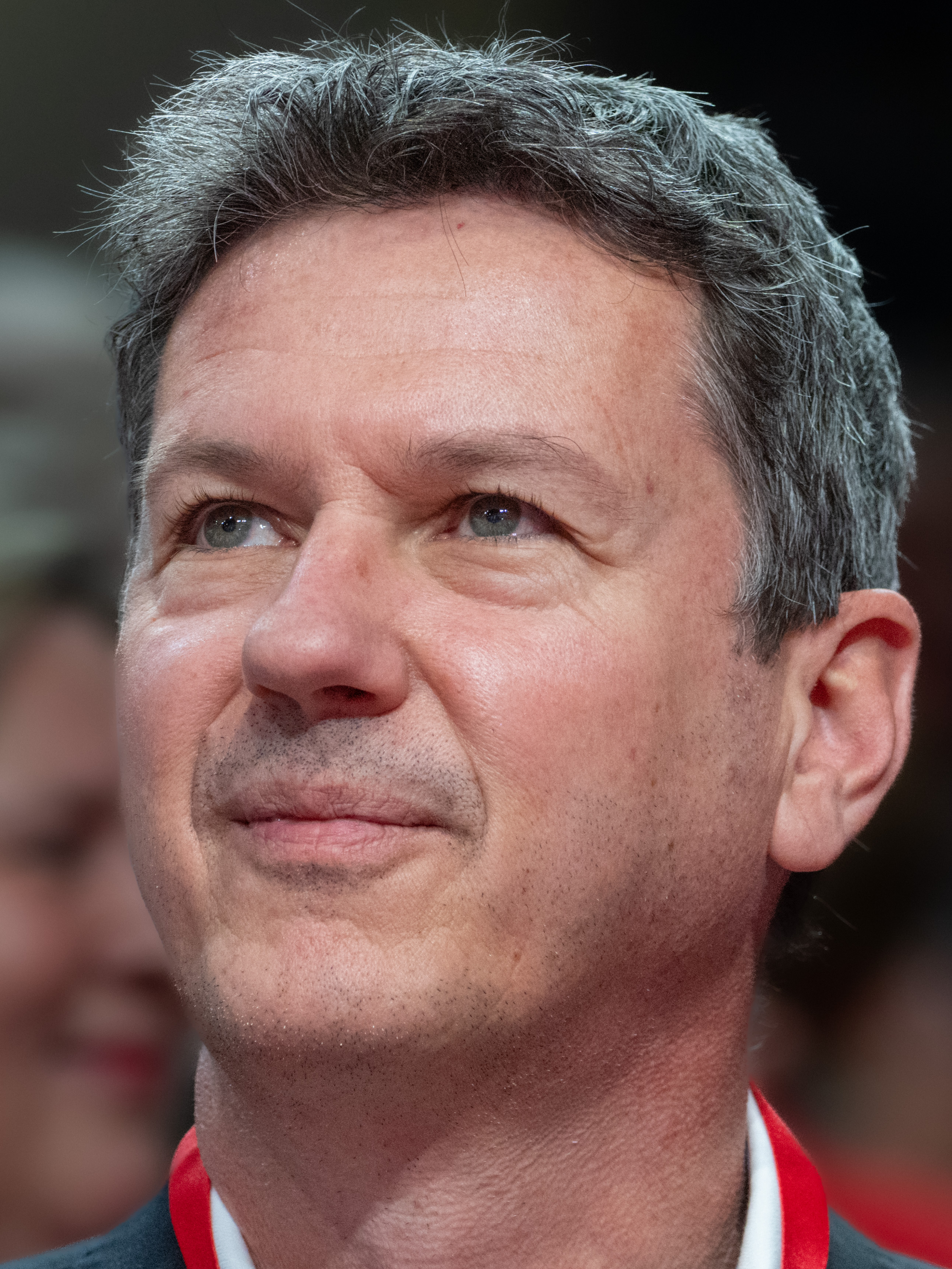
- Incumbent; Daniel Fellner since 7 April 2026
- Constituting instrument: Constitution of Austria

This is a list of governors of the Austrian state of Carinthia:

== Austro-Hungarian Empire (1861–1918) ==
Presidents of the province of Carinthia, assisted by Provincial Governors

President	From	To	Provincial Governor
Franz Freiherr von Schluga	1861	1867	Georg Graf von Thurn-Valsassina (1861)
Franz Freiherr von Schluga	1861	1867	Johann Anton Graf von Goëss (1861–1876)
Count Karl Sigmund von Hohenwart	1867	1868	Johann Anton Graf von Goëss (1861–1876)
Guido Graf von Kübeck	1868	1870	Johann Anton Graf von Goëss (1861–1876)
Kaspar Graf von Lodron-Laterano	1870	1870	Johann Anton Graf von Goëss (1861–1876)
Alois Freiherr von Ceschi a Santa Croce	1870	1872	Johann Anton Graf von Goëss (1861–1876)
Kaspar Graf von Lodron-Laterano	1873	1880	Johann Anton Graf von Goëss (1861–1876)
Kaspar Graf von Lodron-Laterano	1873	1880	Johann Stieger (1876–1884)
Franz Freiherr von Schmidt-Zabiérow	1880	1897	Johann Stieger (1876–1884)
Franz Freiherr von Schmidt-Zabiérow	1880	1897	Joseph Erwein (1884–1897)
Otto Ritter Fraydt von Fraydenegg	1897	1903	Zeno Graf von Goëss (1897–1909)
Robert Freiherr von Hein	1903	1912	Zeno Graf von Goëss (1897–1909)
Robert Freiherr von Hein	1903	1912	Leopold Freiherr von Aichelburg-Labia (1909–1918)

== Austria ==
Portrait	Name (Born-Died)	Term			Political Party
Portrait	Name (Born-Died)	Took office	Left office	Duration	Political Party
First Republic
Arthur Lemisch [de]	Arthur Lemisch (1865–1953)	11 November 1918	22 July 1921	2 years, 253 days	Independent
Florian Gröger [de]	Florian Gröger (1871–1927)	22 July 1921	6 November 1923	2 years, 107 days	SPÖ
Vinzenz Schumy [de]	Vinzenz Schumy (1878–1962)	6 November 1923	15 June 1927	3 years, 221 days	Landbund
Arthur Lemisch [de]	Arthur Lemisch (1865–1953)	15 June 1927	21 January 1931	3 years, 220 days	Independent
Ferdinand Kernmaier [de]	Ferdinand Kernmaier (1884–1941)	22 January 1931	16 February 1934	3 years, 25 days	Landbund
Sylvester Leer [de]	Sylvester Leer (1880–1957)	16 February 1934	7 March 1934	19 days	CS
Austrofascism
Ludwig Hülgerth	Ludwig Hülgerth (1875–1939)	7 March 1934	3 November 1936	2 years, 241 days	Heimatblock; VF
Arnold Sucher [de]	Arnold Sucher (1898–1983)	3 November 1936	11 March 1938	1 year, 128 days	VF
Nazi Germany (Reichsstatthalter and Gauleiter of the Reichsgau of Carinthia)
Wladimir von Pawlowski	Wladimir von Pawlowski (1891–1961)	11 March 1938	1 June 1938	82 days	NSDAP
Hubert Klausner	Hubert Klausner (1892–1939)	1 June 1938	12 February 1939	256 days	NSDAP
Wladimir von Pawlowski	Wladimir von Pawlowski (1891–1961)	12 February 1939	1 December 1941	2 years, 292 days	NSDAP
Friedrich Rainer	Friedrich Rainer (1903–1947)	1 December 1941	7 May 1945	3 years, 157 days	NSDAP
Second Republic
Hans Piesch [de]	Hans Piesch (1889–1966)	8 May 1945	25 April 1947	1 year, 352 days	SPÖ
Ferdinand Wedenig [de]	Ferdinand Wedenig (1896–1975)	25 April 1947	12 April 1965	17 years, 352 days	SPÖ
Hans Sima	Hans Sima (1918–2006)	12 April 1965	12 April 1974	9 years, 0 days	SPÖ
Leopold Wagner	Leopold Wagner (1927–2008)	19 April 1974	27 September 1988	14 years, 161 days	SPÖ
Peter Ambrozy [de]	Peter Ambrozy (born 1946)	27 September 1988	21 April 1989	206 days	SPÖ
Jörg Haider	Jörg Haider (1950–2008)	21 April 1989	21 June 1991	2 years, 61 days	FPÖ
Christof Zernatto [de]	Christof Zernatto (born 1949)	21 June 1991	8 April 1999	7 years, 291 days	ÖVP
Jörg Haider	Jörg Haider (1950–2008)	8 April 1999	11 October 2008 †	9 years, 186 days	FPÖ; BZÖ
Gerhard Dörfler	Gerhard Dörfler (born 1955)	23 October 2008	28 March 2013	4 years, 156 days	BZÖ; FPK
Peter Kaiser	Peter Kaiser (born 1958)	28 March 2013	31 March 2026	13 years, 3 days	SPÖ
Daniel Fellner [de]	Daniel Fellner (born 1977)	7 April 2026	Incumbent	153 days	SPÖ
