= Josef Ratzenböck =

Austrian politician (1929–2025)

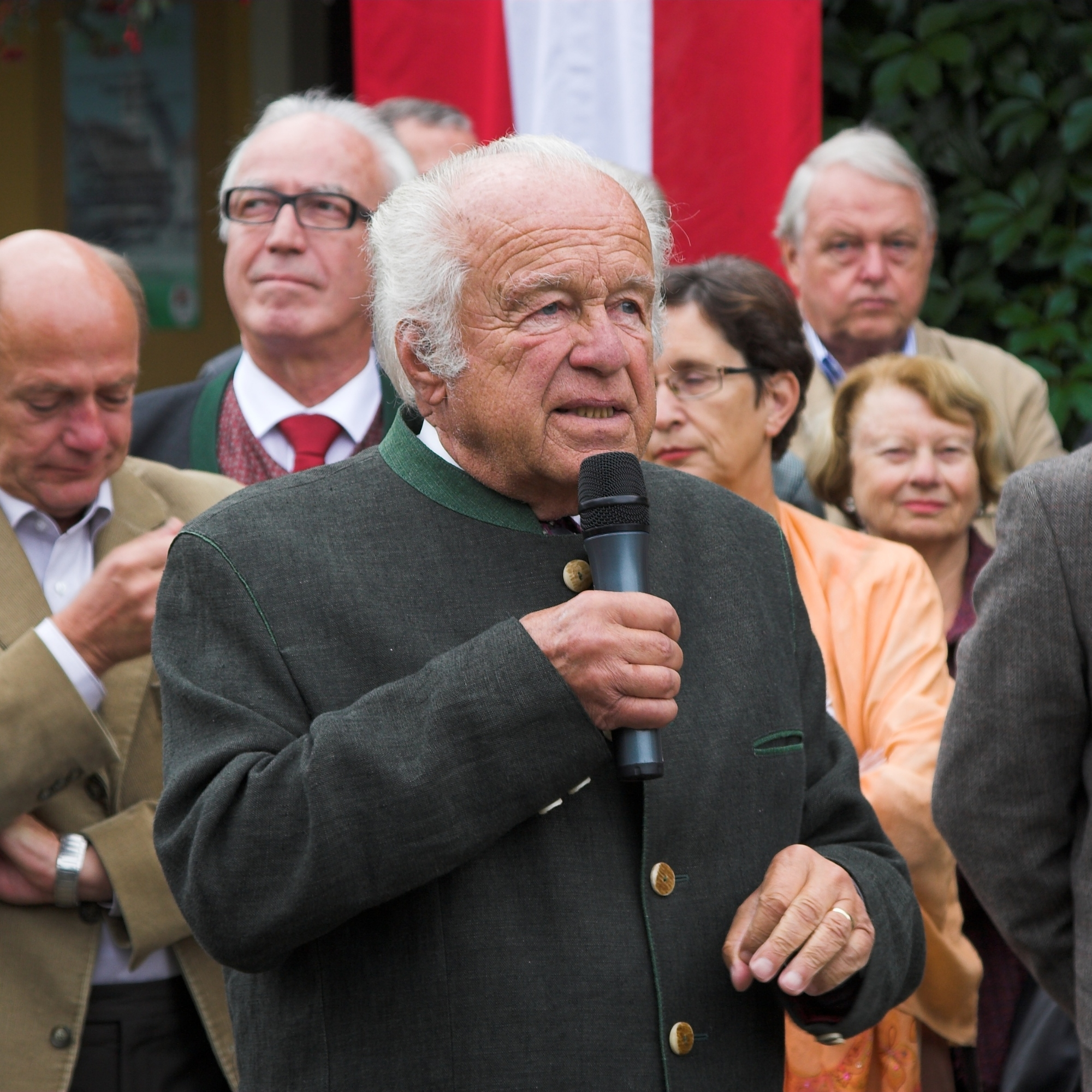
- Ratzenböck in 2009

Governor of Upper Austria
- In office 19 October 1977 – 2 March 1995
- Preceded by: Erwin Wenzl
- Succeeded by: Josef Pühringer

Personal details
- Born: 15 April 1929 Neukirchen am Walde, Upper Austria, Austria
- Died: 23 December 2025 (aged 96)
- Party: Austrian People's Party

Josef Ratzenböck (15 April 1929 – 23 December 2025) was an Austrian politician. He was governor of Upper Austria and the head of the Upper Austrian People's Party. Ratzenböck succeeded Erwin Wenzl (ÖVP) as governor of Upper Austria and was governor of Upper Austria from 19 October 1977 to 2 March 1995. He also served in the Landtag of Upper Austria from 1973 to 1979.

Ratzenböck died on 23 December 2025 at the age of 96.
