= Eduard Wallnöfer =

Austrian politician (1913–1989)

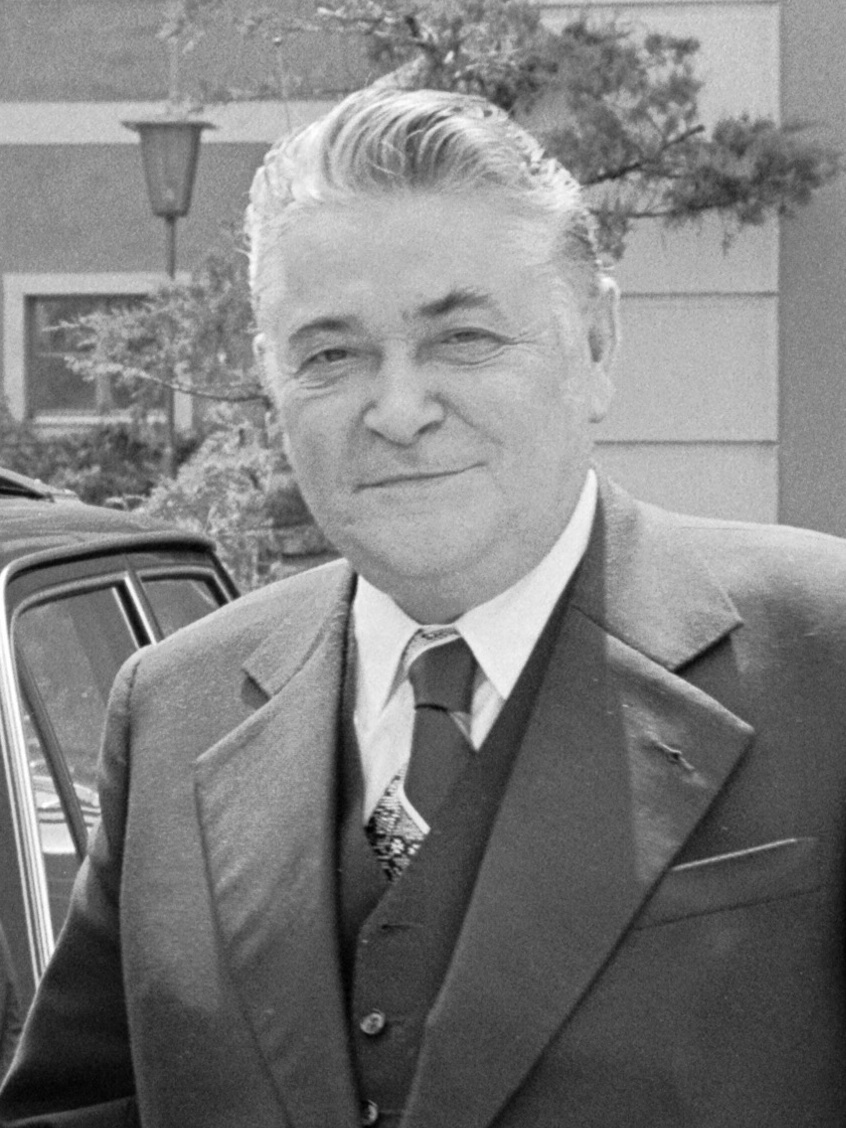

Governor of Tyrol
- In office June 30, 1963 – March 2, 1987
- Preceded by: Hans Tschiggfrey
- Succeeded by: Alois Partl

Personal details
- Born: 11 December 1913; Schluderns, Italy
- Died: 15 March 1989 (aged 75); Innsbruck, Austria
- Political party: Austrian People's Party

Eduard Wallnöfer (11 December 1913 – 15 March 1989) was an Austrian politician from Schluderns.

== Career ==
Wallnöfer succeeded Hans Tschiggfrey as governor of Tyrol. He served from 30 June 1963 to 2 March 1987. He was the longest serving governor of the State of Tyrol since 1945.
