= Leopold Wagner =

Austrian politician (1927–2008)

Leopold Wagner (1927 – 26 September 2008) was an Austrian politician of the Social Democratic Party (SPÖ), serving as governor (Landeshauptmann) of Carinthia from 1974 to 1988.

Wagner was born in Klagenfurt, and was governor of Carinthia for three consecutive terms, with an absolute majority in the state parliament each time, making him the only Carinthian governor with such a lengthy period of unchallenged rule. Along with his deputies, Erwin Frühbauer and Rudolf Gallob, he modernized the state considerably, and was considered a leading figure in its post-World War II politics.

He was controversial within his generally left-wing party, however, for his populist, nationalist tone. He replaced Hans Sima as governor amidst a wave of popular nostalgia for pan-German and nationalist sentiment, which he took advantage of by speaking unapologetically of his former high-ranking position in the Hitler Youth, and inveighing against Carinthia's Slovene minority.

He stepped down as governor in 1988, after being shot and seriously wounded in late 1987 at his 40th high school reunion, during a dispute with a former classmate. His populist nationalism is seen as a forerunner for that of Jörg Haider, who took over as governor of Carinthia a year later, in 1989.
