= Theodor Kery =

Austrian politician (1918 - 2010)

Theodor Kery (24 July 1918 – 9 May 2010) was an Austrian politician belonging to the SPÖ, who served as Governor of Burgenland from 1966 to 1987.
