= List of governors of Lower Austria =

This is a list of governors of the Austrian state of Lower Austria:

== Governors of the Archduchy of Austria below the Enns (1500–1749) ==
- Wolfgang Freiherr von Polheim (1458–1512) 1501–1512
- Georg von Rottal zu Thalberg (see Rottal) (?–1525) 1513–1521; also President of the Lower Austrian Chamber (1523–1525)
- Pietro Bonomo, Bishop of Trieste (i.e. Giovanni Antonio Bonomo; 1458–1546) 1521–1523
- Sigismund Freiherr von Dietrichstein (1484–1533) 1523–1524
- Leonhard von Harrach zu Rohrau (1481–1527) 1524–1525
- Cyriak Freiherr von Polheim und Wartenburg (1495–1533) 1526–1527
- Georg Freiherr von Puchheim zu Raabs und Krumbach (?–1531) 1528–1531
- Christoph von Rauber (from 1533: Fürst) (1466–1536) 1532–1536
- Trojan von Auersperg (1495–1541) 1537–1541
- Hans (III.) Ungnad Freiherr von Sonneck (1493–1564) 1542–1544
- Christoph von Eyczing (1501–1563) 1544–1551, also (1542–1544) Land Marshal of the Lower Austrian Estates
- Gabriel Ritter von Kreuzer (?–1565) 1552–1564
- Joachim Freiherr von Schönkirchen (1517–1572) 1565–1572, also (1560–1563 Land Marshal of the Lower Austrian Estates
- Oswald Philipp von Eyczing (1512–1587) 1572–1587
- Seifried Freiherr von Breuner (1538–1594) 1587–1591
- Ruprecht Freiherr von Stotzingen (c. 1542–1600) 22 June 1592 – 1600
- Wolfgang Freiherr von Hofkirchen (1555–1611) 1600–1601
- Ernst Mollard Freiherr von Reinegg und Drosendorf (before 1576–1621) 1601–1608
- Paul Sixtus Trautson Graf zu Falkenstein (1548–1621) 1608–1621
- Leonhard Helfried Graf von Meggau, Freiherr von Creuzen (1577–1644) 1621–1626
- Seifried Christoph Breuner Freiherr von Stübing, Fladnitz und Rabenstein (1569–1651) 1626–1640, also President of the Lower Austrian Chamber (1600–1609) and Land Marshal of the Lower Austrian Estates (1620–1626)
- Georg Freiherr von Teufel auf Gundersdorf, Eckartsau und Esslingen (c. 1580–1642) 1640–1642
- Johann Franz Trautson Graf zu Falkenstein (1609–1663) 1642–1663, also Land Marshal of the Lower Austrian Estates (1637–1642)
- Konrad Balthasar von Starhemberg (1612–1687, from 1643: Graf) 1663–1687
- Johann Quintin Freiherr von Jörger (see Jörger von Tollet) (1624–1705, from 1658: Graf) 1687–1705
- Ferdinand Karl Graf und Herr von Weltz, Freiherr von Ebenstein und Spiegelfeld (1653–1711) 1705–1711
- Sigismund Friedrich Graf von Khevenhüller (1666–1742, from 1725: Reichsgraf) 1711–1742
- Leopold Johann Victorin Wilhelm Graf von Windisch-Graetz (1686–1746) 1742–1746
- Johann Ferdinand Graf von Kuefstein (1686–1755) 1747–1749

== Governors of the Archduchy of Austria below the Enns (1749–1809) ==
Name and titles	Birth/death	Term of office	Other office
Adam Philipp Losy Graf von Losymthal	?–1781	1749–1750	
Philipp Joseph Graf von Orsini-Rosenberg	1691–1765	1750–1753	
Heinrich Wilhelm Freiherr von Haugwitz	1711–1758	1753–1758	
Franz Ferdinand Graf von Schrattenbach	1707–1785	1759–1770	
Christian August Graf von Seilern-Aspang	1717–1801	1770–1779	
Joseph Johann Nepomuk Graf von Herberstein	1725–1809	1779–1782	
Johann Anton Graf von Pergen	1725–1814	1782–1790	Land Marshal of the Lower Austrian Estates (1775–1790)
Wenzel Graf Sauer von und zu Ankenstein	1742–1799	1791–1795	
Franz Josef Graf von Saurau	1760–1832	1795–1797	Land Marshal of the Lower Austrian Estates (1803–1805)
Jakob Reichsfreiherr von Wöber zu Hagenberg		1797–1802	
Joseph Thaddäus Vogt Freiherr von Sumerau	1749–1817	1802–1804	
Joseph Karl Graf von Dietrichstein	1763–1825	1804–1805	Land Marshal of the Lower Austrian Estates (1811–1825)
Ignaz Karl Graf von Chorinsky, Freiherr von Ledske	1770–1823	1805–1807	
Ferdinand Graf von Bissingen und Nippenburg	1749–1831	1807–1809	

== Governors (Statthalter) of the Archduchy of Austria below the Enns (1809–1918) ==
- Franz Josef Graf von Saurau (1760–1832) 1809–1814, also Land Marshal of the Lower Austrian Estates (1803–1805)
- Ignaz Karl Graf von Chorinsky, Freiherr von Ledske (1770–1823) 1815–1816
- Augustin Freiherr Reichmann von Hochkirchen (1755–1828, until 1817: Augustin Reichmann) 1817–1828
- Alois Graf von Ugarte (1784–1845) 1828–1829
- Franz Graf von Klebelsberg, Freiherr zu Thumburg (1774–1857) 1829–1830
- Johann Adam Freiherr Talatzko von Gestieticz (1778–1858, until 1834: Johann Adam Talatzko) 1830–1848
- Anton Raimund Graf von Lamberg (1795–1869) 1848–1848
- Joseph Wilhelm von Eminger (1801–1858, from 1856: Freiherr von) 1849–1858
- Karl Johann Joseph Prinz von Lobkowitz (1814–1879) 1858–1860
- Anton Halbhuber Freiherr von Festwill (1809–1886, from 1854 Freiherr) 1860–1862
- Gustav Ignaz Graf von Chorinsky, Freiherr von Ledske (1806–1873) 1862–1868
- Philipp Weber von Ebenhof (1818–1900, from 1853: Ritter, from 1880 Freiherr) 1868–1872
- Sigmund Conrad von Eybesfeld (1821–1898, from 1854: Edler. from 1870 Freiherr) 1872–1880
- Ludwig Freiherr Possinger (1823–1899, from 1860: Ritter, from 1870 Freiherr von Choborski) 1880–1889
- Erich Graf von Kielmansegg (1847–1923) 1889–1895
- Friedrich Freiherr Bourguignon von Baumberg (1846–1907) 1895–1895
- Erich Graf von Kielmansegg (1847–1923) 1895–1911
- Richard Graf von Bienerth-Schmerling (1863–1918, Ritter von, from 1868: Freiherr, from 1915: Graf) 1911–1915
- Oktavian Freiherr Regner von Bleyleben (1866–1945, 1911–1919: Freiherr von Bleyleben, from 1919: Oktavian Regner-Bleyleben) 1915–1918

== After 1918: Republic ==
No.	Portrait	Name	Term			Party	Period
No.	Portrait	Name	Took office	Left office	Duration	Party	Period
1		Leopold Steiner	5 November 1918	20 May 1919		Christian Social	First Republic (1918–1934)
2		Albert Sever	20 May 1919	10 November 1920		Social Democrat	First Republic (1918–1934)
3		Johann Mayer	10 November 1920	9 June 1922		Christian Social	First Republic (1918–1934)
4		Karl Buresch	9 June 1922	31 July 1931		Christian Social	First Republic (1918–1934)
5		Josef Reither	31 July 1931	19 May 1932		Christian Social	First Republic (1918–1934)
(4)		Karl Buresch	19 May 1932	18 May 1933		Christian Social	First Republic (1918–1934)
(5)		Josef Reither	18 May 1933	30 July 1934		Christian Social; Fatherland's Front	First Republic (1918–1934)
6		Eduard Baar-Baarenfels	30 July 1934	17 October 1935		Fatherland's Front	Austrofascism (1934–1938)
(5)		Josef Reither	17 October 1935	12 March 1938		Fatherland's Front	Austrofascism (1934–1938)
(Reichsstatthalter and Gauleiter of the Reichsgau of Lower Danube)							Nazi Germany (1938–1945)
7		Roman Jäger	12 March 1938	24 May 1938		NSDAP	Nazi Germany (1938–1945)
8		Hugo Jury	24 May 1938	8 May 1945		NSDAP	Nazi Germany (1938–1945)
9		Leopold Figl	25 May 1945	15 October 1945		ÖVP	Second Republic (1945–present)
(5)		Josef Reither	15 October 1945	4 May 1949		ÖVP	Second Republic (1945–present)
10		Johann Steinböck	4 May 1949	14 January 1962		ÖVP	Second Republic (1945–present)
(9)		Leopold Figl	14 January 1962	9 May 1965		ÖVP	Second Republic (1945–present)
11		Eduard Hartmann	16 June 1965	14 October 1966		ÖVP	Second Republic (1945–present)
12		Andreas Maurer	24 November 1966	22 January 1981		ÖVP	Second Republic (1945–present)
13		Siegfried Ludwig	22 January 1981	20 October 1992		ÖVP	Second Republic (1945–present)
14		Erwin Pröll	20 October 1992	19 April 2017		ÖVP	Second Republic (1945–present)
15		Johanna Mikl-Leitner	19 April 2017	Incumbent		ÖVP	Second Republic (1945–present)

== Longest-serving governors ==
The following table lists all governors of Lower Austria since 1945 ranked by their length of tenure, with the incumbent governor's tenure automatically updating daily.

Rank	Governor	Length of tenure(s)	Timespan(s)	Party
1	Erwin Pröll	24 years, 181 days	1992–2017	ÖVP
2	Andreas Maurer	14 years, 59 days	1966–1981	ÖVP
3	Johann Steinböck	12 years, 255 days	1949–1962	ÖVP
4	Siegfried Ludwig	11 years, 272 days	1981–1992	ÖVP
5	Johanna Mikl-Leitner	9 years, 183 days	2017–present	ÖVP
6	Josef Reither	3 years, 201 days	1945–1949	ÖVP
7	Leopold Figl (2nd term)	3 years, 115 days	1962–1965	ÖVP
8	Eduard Hartmann	1 year, 120 days	1965–1966	ÖVP
9	Leopold Figl (1st term)	143 days	1945	ÖVP

Notes:

- Green indicates the current incumbent governor
- Mikl-Leitner's rank will rise as her tenure continues
- Leopold Figl served two non-consecutive terms; both are shown separately

== Governors by party ==
The following table summarizes governors of Lower Austria since 1945 grouped by political party.

Party	Total time in office	Number of governors	Governors
**ÖVP; Austrian People's Party**	**81 years, 68 days (ongoing)**	8	Leopold Figl, Josef Reither, Johann Steinböck, Eduard Hartmann, Andreas Maurer, Siegfried Ludwig, Erwin Pröll, **Johanna Mikl-Leitner**

Notes:

- Green indicates the party of the current incumbent governor
- Bold name indicates the current incumbent governor
- All governors since 1945 have been members of the ÖVP
- Total time is calculated from the first governorship (25 May 1945), excluding the brief gaps between terms

== Age-related statistics ==
The following table shows age-related data for all governors of Lower Austria since 1945, with living governors' ages automatically updating.

Governor	Born	Age at start of governorship	Age at end of governorship	Post-governorship timespan	Died	Lifespan
Leopold Figl (1st term)	2 October 1902	**42 years, 235 days** 25 May 1945	**43 years, 13 days** 15 October 1945	16 years, 91 days	9 May 1965	62 years, 219 days
Josef Reither	26 June 1880	**65 years, 111 days** 15 October 1945	**68 years, 312 days** 4 May 1949	361 days	30 April 1950	69 years, 308 days
Johann Steinböck	12 June 1894	**54 years, 326 days** 4 May 1949	**67 years, 216 days** 14 January 1962	—	14 January 1962	67 years, 216 days
Leopold Figl (2nd term)	2 October 1902	**59 years, 104 days** 14 January 1962	**62 years, 219 days** 9 May 1965	—	9 May 1965	62 years, 219 days
Eduard Hartmann	3 September 1904	**60 years, 286 days** 16 June 1965	**62 years, 41 days** 14 October 1966	—	14 October 1966	62 years, 41 days
Andreas Maurer	7 September 1919	**47 years, 78 days** 24 November 1966	**61 years, 137 days** 22 January 1981	29 years, 276 days	25 October 2010	91 years, 48 days
Siegfried Ludwig	14 February 1926	**54 years, 343 days** 22 January 1981	**66 years, 249 days** 20 October 1992	20 years, 178 days	16 April 2013	87 years, 61 days
Erwin Pröll	24 December 1946	**45 years, 301 days** 20 October 1992	**70 years, 116 days** 19 April 2017	9 years, 183 days	—	79 years, 299 days
**Johanna Mikl-Leitner**	9 February 1964	**53 years, 69 days** 19 April 2017	Incumbent			62 years, 252 days

Notes:

- Light green indicates living former governors
- Green indicates the current incumbent governor
- Leopold Figl served two non-consecutive terms; both are shown separately
- Steinböck and Hartmann died in office, hence "—" for post-governorship timespan
- Living governors' post-governorship timespan and lifespan automatically update daily

== Graphical representation ==
This is a graphical lifespan timeline of the governors of Lower Austria since 1945. They are listed in order of first assuming office.

The following chart shows governors by their age (living governors in green), with the years of their time in office in color.
