= 2024 in Austria =

- Decades: 2000s; 2010s; 2020s
- See also: Other events of 2024; List of years in Austria

Events in the year 2024 in Austria.

== Incumbents ==
- President: Alexander Van der Bellen
- Chancellor: Karl Nehammer

=== Governors ===
- Burgenland: Hans Peter Doskozil
- Carinthia: Peter Kaiser
- Lower Austria: Johanna Mikl-Leitner
- Salzburg: Wilfried Haslauer Jr.
- Styria: Christopher Drexler, Mario Kunasek
- Tyrol: Anton Mattle
- Upper Austria: Thomas Stelzer
- Vienna: Michael Ludwig
- Vorarlberg: Markus Wallner

== Events ==
=== January ===
- January 1 – One person is killed and 21 more are injured during a fire at a bar in Graz during a New Year's party.

=== February ===
- February 15–18 – 2024 Men's EuroHockey Indoor Club Cup
- February 23 – Three women are killed during a mass stabbing at a brothel in Vienna. A 27-year-old male suspect is arrested.

=== March ===
- March 29 – Egisto Ott, a former officer of the Federal Office for the Protection of the Constitution and Counterterrorism, is arrested on suspicion of spying for Russia.

=== April ===
- April 11 – Three Dutch skiers are killed in an avalanche near Sölden.
- April 21–27 – 2024 IIHF Women's World Championship Division I A at Klagenfurt.

=== June ===
- June 9 – 2024 European Parliament election: The Freedom Party of Austria emerges as the largest party in the Austrian contingent for the European Parliament.

=== July ===
- July 21 – More than 50 people are arrested in Vienna during clashes between police and demonstrators protesting against a far-right march.

=== August ===
- August 6 – The Austrian branch of the climate activist movement Last Generation announces that it would stop its protests, citing a lack of "any prospect to success" and the government's inaction on climate change.
- August 7 – Two Islamic State affiliated men are arrested in Ternitz for allegedly planning to commit terrorism in Vienna, including at a Taylor Swift concert, resulting in the cancellation of the latter.
- August 13 – Chancellor Karl Nehammer announces a package of new anti-terrorism measures, including granting Austrian security services the capability to monitor private communications sent on messaging and social media apps, giving them the ability to decrypt encrypted messages, and restricting the right to assembly of groups declared "hostile to democracy".
- August 18 – Record rainfall strikes parts of Vienna with most of the city's average total summer rainfall falling in just one hour, causing significant flooding and damage.

=== September ===
- September 12–17 – At least four people are killed amid flooding caused by Storm Boris.
- September 29 – 2024 Austrian legislative election: The far-right Freedom Party of Austria (FPÖ) places first, winning 29.2% of the vote and achieving its best result in its history. The Austrian People's Party (ÖVP) of Chancellor Karl Nehammer places second, while the centre-left Social Democratic Party (SPÖ) wins just 21.0%, marking its worst result ever in the National Council.

=== October ===
- October 4 – The European Court of Justice rules against Austria's refusal to grant refugee status to two Afghan women asylum-seekers and declares discriminatory measures adopted by the Taliban against women as “acts of persecution” that qualifies the petitioners to stay in the country.
- October 13 – 2024 Vorarlberg state election
- October 22 – President Alexander Van der Bellen formally asks outgoing Chancellor Karl Nehammer of the ÖVP to form another government after it and other mainstream parties refuse to form a coalition with the FPÖ, despite the latter being the largest single party in the September elections.
- October 28 – Two people, including a mayor, are found shot dead in related incidents in Altenfelden, Upper Austria. The suspect is found dead on 1 November.

=== November ===
- November 16 – The Russian energy firm Gazprom halts natural gas shipments to Austria after the domestic utility firm OMV stops paying bills to offset a 230 million-euro ($242 million) arbitral award from the International Chamber of Commerce over an earlier cutoff to a German subsidiary.
- November 24 – 2024 Styrian state election
- November 28 to December 15 – 2024 European Women's Handball Championship

=== December ===
- December 1 – The Würstelstand is recognized by UNESCO as an Intangible cultural heritage.
- December 23 – An Airbus operated by Swiss International Air Lines makes an emergency landing at Graz Airport on its way from Bucharest to Zurich due to engine problems and smoke. One crew member subsequently dies from injuries sustained in the incident.

== Holidays ==
- January 1 – New Year's Day
- January 6 – Epiphany
- March 28 – Maundy Thursday
- March 29 – Good Friday
- April 1 – Easter Monday
- May 1 – International Workers' Day
- May 20 – Whit Monday
- May 30 – Corpus Christi
- August 15 – Assumption Day
- October 26 – National Day of Austria
- November 1 – All Saints' Day
- December 8 – Immaculate Conception
- December 25 – Christmas Day
- December 26 – Saint Stephen's Day

== Art and entertainment ==
- List of 2024 box office number-one films in Austria
- List of Austrian films of 2024
- List of Austrian European Film Award winners and nominees
- List of Austrian submissions for the Academy Award for Best International Feature Film

== Deaths ==
=== January ===
- January 5 – Helena Adler, 40, writer and visual artist, after long illness, (b. 1983)
- January 14:
  - Elisabeth Trissenaar, 79, actress (Angry Harvest, The Stationmaster's Wife, Mario and the Magician), (b. 1944)
  - Lutz Lischka, 79, Olympic judoka (1972), (b. 1944)
- January 18 – Heinz Tesar, 84, architect, (b. 1939)

=== February ===
- February 10 – Günter Brus, 85, artist, (b. 1938)
- February 12 – Karl-Werner Rüsch, 86, civil engineer and politician, (b. 1937)

=== June ===
- June 3 – Brigitte Bierlein, 74, Chancellor of Austria (2019–2020) and President of the Constitutional Court (2018–2019), (b. 1949)

=== July ===
- July 1 – Hermine Liska, 94, Austrian witness of the persecution of Jehovah's Witnesses in Nazi Germany, (b. 1930)
- July 13 – Johann Seitinger, 63, Austrian politician, member of the Landtag Styria (2003–2023), (b. 1961)
- July 18 – Fritz Verzetnitsch, 79, Austrian trade unionist and politician, president of the Austrian Trade Union Federation (1987–2006) and the ETUC (1993–2003), (b. 1945)
- July 19 – Wolfgang Smith, 94, Austrian mathematician, physicist, and philosopher, (b. 1930)
- July 31 – Diana Phipps Sternberg, 88, Czech-Austrian aristocrat and humanitarian, (b. 1936)

=== August ===
- August 12 – Richard Lugner, 91, Austrian construction industry executive, (b. 1932)
- August 14
  - Eva Kreisky, 79, Austrian political scientist and jurist, (b. 1944)
  - Heinrich Thun, 85, Austrian Olympic athlete (1960, 1964), heart attack, (b. 1938)
- August 21 – Sonja Pachta, 83, Austrian tennis player, (b. 1941)
- August 28
  - Adolf Antrich, 83, Austrian footballer (SK Rapid Wien, Kapfenberger SV, national team), (b. 1940)
  - Andreas Dückstein, 97, Austrian chess grandmaster, (b. 1927)

=== September ===
- September 5 – Jacques Breuer, 67, Austrian actor (Derrick, The Second Victory), stroke, (b. 1956)
- September 7
  - Franz Sauerzopf, 92, Austrian judge and politician, member of the Landtag Burgenland (1972–1986), (b. 1932)
  - Heinrich Schmelz, 94, Austrian civil servant and politician, MP (1977–1988), (b. 1930)

=== October ===
- October 7 – Lore Segal, 96, Austrian-born American author, (b. 1928)

== See also ==
- 2024 in the European Union
- 2024 in Europe
