= 2025 in Austria =

- Decades: 2000s; 2010s; 2020s
- See also: Other events of 2025; List of years in Austria

Events in the year 2025 in Austria.

== Incumbents ==
- President: Alexander Van der Bellen
- Chancellor: Karl Nehammer (until 10 January), Alexander Schallenberg (acting, 10 January to 3 March); Christian Stocker (starting 3 March)

=== Governors ===
- Burgenland: Hans Peter Doskozil
- Carinthia: Peter Kaiser
- Lower Austria: Johanna Mikl-Leitner
- Salzburg: Wilfried Haslauer Jr.
- Styria: Mario Kunasek
- Tyrol: Anton Mattle
- Upper Austria: Thomas Stelzer
- Vienna: Michael Ludwig
- Vorarlberg: Markus Wallner

== Events ==
=== January ===
- January – February – Vienna Ball Season
- 4 January – Karl Nehammer announces his resignation as Chancellor and leader of the Austrian People's Party (ÖVP) after the party fails to form a government following the 2024 Austrian legislative election.
- 6 January – Herbert Kickl of the far-right Freedom Party of Austria (FPÖ) receives a mandate from President Alexander Van der Bellen to form a new government.
- 19 January – 2025 Burgenland state election: The SPÖ loses its absolute majority in the Landtag of Burgenland.

=== February ===
- 4 – 16 February – FIS Alpine World Ski Championships
- 10 February – A 14-year-old boy is arrested on suspicion of plotting an attack on Wien Westbahnhof railway station in Vienna on behalf of Islamic State.
- 12 February – Herbert Kickl surrenders his mandate to form a government to President Alexander Van der Bellen after talks with the ÖVP to form a coalition fail.
- 15 February – 2025 Villach stabbing attack: A 14-year-old boy is killed while five people are injured in a knife attack in Villach. The suspect, a 23-year-old Syrian asylum seeker, is arrested.
- 27 February – The SPÖ, ÖVP and NEOS announce an agreement to form a coalition government to be led by the ÖVP's Christian Stocker as Chancellor.

=== March ===
- 3 March – Christian Stocker is inaugurated as Chancellor.
- 12 March – The government suspends family reunion procedures for migrants, citing issues in adequately integrating them.

=== April ===
- 27 April – 2025 Viennese state election

=== May ===
- 14 May – The Austria Startup Conference
- 17 May – Austria's JJ wins Eurovision 2025 in Switzerland with the single "Wasted Love".
- 26 May – A court in Vienna overturns the conviction of former chancellor Sebastian Kurz for perjury in 2024.
- 29 May–1 June – Narzissenfest | Daffodil Festival

=== June ===
- 10 June – Eleven people, including the gunman, are killed in a school shooting in Graz.
- 13 June – Summer Night Concert Schönbrunn
- 20– 22 June – Donauinselfest
- 27 – 29 June – Austrian Grand Prix
- 30 June – A mudslide hits the Gschnitztal valley in Tyrol, prompting the evacuation of 100 people.

=== July ===
- July – August – Salzburg Festival (specific date to be announced)
- July – August – Festival of Early Music (specific date to be announced)
- 3 July – 20 July – Wachau Apricot Festival
- 5 July – A light propeller aircraft originating from Germany crashes near Wald im Pinzgau, killing all four people on board.
- 13 July – A man kills one person and seriously wounds another before shooting himself in Traiskirchen, Lower Austria.
- 16 July – 17 August – Bregenzer Festspiele
- 25 July – 2 August – La Strada
- 25 July – An accomplice of the main suspect in the 2024 Vienna terrorism plot is convicted by a court in Wiener Neustadt on a separate charge of involvement with Islamic State and sentenced to two years' imprisonment.
- 28 July – Thomas Oberreiter resigns as Austria's ambassador to the European Union amid allegations that he had kept a private blog containing sexually explicit content.

=== August ===
- 20 August – The Austrian public broadcaster ORF designates the Wiener Stadthalle in Vienna as the venue for Eurovision 2026.
- 26 August – An acquaintance of the main suspect in the 2024 Vienna terrorism plot is convicted by a court in Germany for plotting and supporting a terrorist attack overseas and sentenced to a suspended 18-month prison term.

=== September ===
- 3 September – 7 September – Ars Electronica Festival
- 30 September – Austria expels a Russian diplomat accused of spying on the oil company OMV.

=== November ===
- 3 November – A Latvian national is arrested at Salzburg Hauptbahnhof for threatening to stage a hostage crisis aboard a train traveling from Vienna to Innsbruck.
- 6 November – The government announces the discovery by the Directorate State Protection and Intelligence Service of a weapons cache linked to Hamas in Vienna.
- mid November – Late December – Christmas markets
- 18 November – Austria qualifies for the 2026 FIFA World Cup after drawing 1–1 against Bosnia and Herzegovina at the 2026 FIFA World Cup qualification.
- 21 November – 24 November – 45th Jazzfestival Saalfelden
- 27 November
  - Three skiers are injured while several others are reported missing following an avalanche that hits the Daunscharte Pass on the Stubai Glacier in Tyrol.
  - Austria finishes in second place at the 2025 FIFA U-17 World Cup in Qatar after losing to Portugal 1–0 in the final.

=== December ===
- 9 December – A court in Vienna dismisses an extradition request by the United States for Ukrainian oligarch Dmytro Firtash on charges of bribery.
- 11 December – The National Council passes a bill outlawing the wearing of Muslim headscarves by girls under 14 years old.

=== All year round ===
- 200th Anniversary of Johann Strauss
- 60 Years of Sound of Music

== Holidays ==
- 1 January – New Year's Day
- 6 January – Epiphany
- 18 April – Maundy Thursday
- 19 April – Good Friday
- 21 April – Easter Monday
- 1 May – International Workers' Day
- 9 June – Whit Monday
- 19 June – Corpus Christi
- 15 August – Assumption Day
- 26 October – National Day of Austria
- 1 November – All Saints' Day
- 8 December – Immaculate Conception
- 25 December – Christmas Day
- 26 December – Saint Stephen's Day

== Art and entertainment ==
- List of Austrian European Film Award winners and nominees
- List of Austrian submissions for the Academy Award for Best International Feature Film

== Deaths ==
=== January ===
- 2 January – Thomas Streicher, 66, mathematician
- 9 January – Otto Schenk, 94, actor (Dunja, Always Trouble with the Reverend), film (Die Fledermaus) and theatre director
- 13 January – Walter Deutsch, 101, musicologist
- 16 January – Hans Dobida, 95, ice hockey administrator, president of the Austrian Ice Hockey Association (1977–1996)
- 17 January – Martin Pollack, 80, journalist and author
- 20 January – Reinhard Todt, 75, politician, member (2001–2018) and president (2013, 2018) of the Federal Council
- 27 January – Baldur Preiml, 85, ski jumper, Olympic bronze medalist (1968)
- 29 January – Max Schautzer, 84, Austrian-born German television and radio presenter (Westdeutscher Rundfunk)>

=== February ===
- 1 February – Peter Schmidl, 84, clarinetist, principal clarinetist of the Vienna Philharmonic Orchestra
- 2 February
  - Johannes Hübner, 68, politician, member of the National Council (2008–2017) and the Federal Council (2020–2023)
  - Marion Wiesel, 94, Austrian-American translator and Holocaust survivor
- 3 February – Herbert Madejski, 79, politician, MP (2013)
- 26 February – Hans Pirkner, 78, footballer (Austria Wien, Alpine Donawitz, national team)

=== March ===
- 12 March
  - Walter Schwimmer, 82, politician and diplomat, secretary general of the Council of Europe (1999–2004)
  - Norbert Cyffer, 81, German-Austrian linguist
- 26 March – Hannes Tretter, 73, lawyer

=== April ===
- 16 April – Peter Ablinger, 66, composer
- 23 April – Waltraut Haas, 97, actress and singer.

=== June ===
- 17 June – Alfred Brendel, 94, pianist.

=== July ===
- 17 July – Felix Baumgartner, 56, parachutist (Red Bull Stratos).

=== September–December ===
- 27 September – Georg Stefan Troller, 103, journalist, screenwriter and director.
- 3 November – Peter Skalicky, 84, German-born academic
- 23 December – Josef Ratzenböck, 96, governor of Upper Austria (1977–1995).

== See also ==
- 2025 in the European Union
- 2025 in Europe
