= 2026 in Austria =

- Decades: 2000s; 2010s; 2020s
- See also: Other events of 2026; List of years in Austria

Events in the year 2026 in Austria.

== Incumbents ==
- President: Alexander Van der Bellen
- Chancellor: Christian Stocker

== Events ==
=== January ===
- 11 January – A skier is killed in an avalanche in Weerberg, Tyrol.
- 13 January – A Czech skier is killed in an avalanche in Bad Gastein.
- 17 January –
  - Four skiers are killed and two others are injured in an avalanche in the Gastein Valley. Another skier later dies in a different avalanche in Bad Hofgastein.
  - Three Czech skiers are killed in an avalanche in Pusterwald.

=== February ===
- 16 February – A 21-year old suspect in the 2024 Vienna terrorism plot is charged with terrorism-related offences.
- 20 February –
  - Five people are killed in Linz and Tyrol following adverse conditions caused by a snowstorm.
  - A hiker accused of murdering his girlfriend by abandoning her on a climbing trip to the Grossglockner in 2025 is convicted of gross negligent manslaughter after the woman dies from hypothermia and is sentenced to a five-month suspended prison term.

=== April ===
- 2 April – Austria denies U.S. aircraft use of its ‌airspace for military operations against Iran.
- 19 April – Hipp Holding orders a recall of its baby food products in Austria following the discovery of a tampered product believed to have been deliberately laced with rat poison in Burgenland.
- 28 April – A 21-year old defendant pleads guilty before a court in Vienna on charges of participating in the 2024 Vienna terrorism plot. He is sentenced to 15 years' imprisonment on 28 May.

=== May ===
- 3 May – Austria expels three staff of the Russian embassy in Vienna on charges of spying.
- 12–16 May – Eurovision Song Contest 2026

=== June ===
- 3 June – Austria is elected to a rotating seat at the United Nations Security Council.
- 11 June–19 July – Austria participates at the 2026 FIFA World Cup, finishing in the Round of 32 with a 0-3 loss against Spain at SoFi Stadium in Los Angeles. This is the first World Cup Austria participates in since 1998.
- 19 June – A court in Canada convicts Magna International founder Frank Stronach of sexual assault and indecent assault for incidents that happened between the 1970s and 1990s.

=== July ===
- 23 July – A magnitude 4.2 earthquake hits Lower Austria, damaging 35 buildings.

=== August ===
- 27 August – A 673-piece platinum and diamond necklace previously worn by former Egyptian queen Nazli Sabri is stolen following a heist at the Museum of Applied Arts, Vienna.

=== September ===
- 14 September – Austria prevents the head of the Atomic Energy Organization of Iran, Mohammad Eslami, from attending the IAEA's annual conference in Vienna due to US opposition, citing its sanctions against him.

=== November ===
- 5 November – Several trans-European passenger aircraft are searched in Vienna after being subjected to bomb threats that are subsequently found to be false.

== Holidays ==
- 1 January – New Year's Day
- 6 January – Epiphany
- 6 April – Easter Monday
- 1 May – International Workers' Day
- 25 May – Whit Monday
- 4 June – Corpus Christi
- 15 August – Assumption Day
- 26 October – National Day of Austria
- 1 November – All Saints' Day
- 8 December – Immaculate Conception
- 25 December – Christmas Day
- 26 December – Saint Stephen's Day

== Deaths ==
- 3 January – Eva Schloss, 96, Holocaust survivor.
- 16 April –
  - Alex Manninger, 48, footballer.
  - Oleg Maisenberg, 80, Ukrainian-born pianist.
- 12 May – Anna Wagner, 111, supercentenarian.
- 14 May – Valie Export, 85, video artist.
- 2 August – Monika Helfer, 78, writer.
- 7 September – Lucia Sisic, 22, beauty queen, Miss Austria (since 2024).
- 22 October – Mélanie Berger-Volle, 105, antifascist activist.

== See also ==
- 2026 in the European Union
- 2026 in Europe
