= Madejski =

Madejski (feminine: Madejska; plural: Madejscy) is a Polish surname. It may refer to:

- Edward Madejski (1914–1996), Polish footballer
- Herbert Madejski (1945–2025), Austrian politician
- John Madejski (born 1941), British businessman
  - Madejski Stadium, Reading F.C.'s home venue, named after John Madejski, the club's chairman
- Piotr Madejski (born 1983), Polish footballer
