= 2023 in Austria =

- Decades: 2000s; 2010s; 2020s
- See also: Other events of 2023; List of years in Austria

Events in the year 2023 in Austria.

== Incumbents ==
- President: Alexander Van der Bellen
- Chancellor: Karl Nehammer

=== Governors ===
- Burgenland: Hans Peter Doskozil
- Carinthia: Peter Kaiser
- Lower Austria: Johanna Mikl-Leitner
- Salzburg: Wilfried Haslauer Jr.
- Styria: Christopher Drexler
- Tyrol: Anton Mattle
- Upper Austria: Thomas Stelzer
- Vienna: Michael Ludwig
- Vorarlberg: Markus Wallner

== Events ==
- January 10 – the Criminal Court of Vienna acquitted former Freedom Party of Austria (FPÖ) leader Heinz-Christian Strache, citing lack of proof.
- January 29 – 2023 Lower Austrian state election: Incumbent Austrian People's Party (ÖVP) remains strongest with slightly less than 40%, the party's weakest result in Lower Austria yet.
- February 5 – Avalanches kill eight tourists across the Austrian Alps.
- March 5 – 2023 Carinthian state election: Social Democratic Party of Austria (SPÖ) loses 9% of votes but remains strongest party with roughly 39% of votes.
- March 17 – In Lower Austria, the ÖVP forms a coalition with the FPÖ.
- March 30 – Lawmakers from the right-wing Freedom Party of Austria walk out from the lower house of Austria's parliament during a speech by Ukrainian President Volodymyr Zelenskyy, as a protest against the violation of Austria's national principle of neutrality.
- March 31 – In Carinthia, the SPÖ renews its coalition with the ÖVP.
- April 23 – 2023 Salzburg state election: Following the election, a coalition between ÖVP and FPÖ was agreed on, the first of its kind in Salzburg.
- April 24–June 3 – 2023 Social Democratic Party of Austria leadership election: Hans Peter Doskozil initially leads in the non-binding member vote, but Andreas Babler is officially elected as new chairman during a party congress in Linz on June 3.
- May 30 – Three people are killed during a fire at a hospital in Mödling.
- June 30 – Wiener Zeitung, one of the oldest newspapers still published in the world, ends its daily print after 320 years (1703).
- September 12 – At Salzburg Zoo, a zookeeper is killed and another is injured by a rhinoceros in its enclosure. The zoo remains closed.
- October 11 – Police in Vienna, announce that they have banned a pro-Palestinian protest over mentions of "from the river to the sea" in invitations and the characterization of the protest as a call for violence.
- November 3 – A small plane en route from Zagreb, Croatia, crashes as it approached Salzburg, killing four people.
- November 13 – Justice Minister Alma Zadić announces the allocation of €33 million (around US$35 million) to compensate approximately 11,000 LGBT people affected by the country's historical discriminatory laws.

== Sports ==
=== Scheduled ===
- 2022–23 Austrian Football Bundesliga
- 2022–23 Austrian Cup
- Austrian Grand Prix
- 2023 ACCR Formula 4 Championship

== Deaths ==
=== January ===
- 6 January
  - Ernst Grissemann, 88, radio host, journalist, and actor (b. 1934)
  - Karl Pfeifer, 94, journalist (b. 1928)
- 7 January – Walter Intemann, 78, businessman and politician (b. 1944)
- 10 January – Traudl Hecher, 79, World Cup alpine ski racer and Olympic medalist (b. 1943)
- 17 January – Richard Oesterreicher, 90, conductor and jazz musician (b. 1930)
- 18 January
  - Melitta Muszely, 95, opera singer (b. 1927)
  - Leopold Potesil, 89, boxer (b. 1933)
- 19 January – Norbert Sattler, 71, kayaker and water slalomist (b. 1951)
- 21 January
  - Kurt Schneider, 90, racing cyclist (b. 1932)
  - Friedrich Weissensteiner, 95, historian and writer (b. 1927)
- 27 January – Martin Purtscher, 94, politician (b. 1928)

=== April ===
- 1 April – Hans Ettmayer, 76, footballer
- 17 April – Ernst Oberaigner, 90, Olympic alpine skier (1960)

=== June ===
- 1 June – Reinhold Senn, 86, luger, Olympic silver medallist (1964)

=== August ===
- 1 August – Franz Csandl, 74, Olympic boxer (1972)
- 5 August – Helmut Siber, 81, international footballer
- 17 August – Gudrun Pflüger, 50, Austrian mountain runner, four-time world champion (cancer)

=== November ===
- 1 November – Gregor Hammerl, 81, politician, ex President of the Federal Council of Austria (b. 1942)
