= Gerstl =

Gerstl is a surname. Notable people with the surname include:

- Elfriede Gerstl (1932–2009), Austrian author and Holocaust survivor
- Richard Gerstl (1883–1908), Austrian painter
- Wolfgang Gerstl (born 1961), Austrian politician
