= 2027 in Austria =

- Decades: 2000s; 2010s; 2020s
- See also: Other events of 2027; List of years in Austria

Events in the year 2027 in Austria.

== Incumbents ==
- President: Alexander Van der Bellen
- Chancellor: Christian Stocker

== Events ==
=== Scheduled ===
- 2027 Tyrolean state election

== Holidays ==
- 1 January – New Year's Day
- 6 January – Epiphany
- 29 March – Easter Monday
- 1 May – International Workers' Day
- 17 May – Whit Monday
- 4 June – Corpus Christi
- 15 August – Assumption Day
- 26 October – National Day of Austria
- 1 November – All Saints' Day
- 8 December – Immaculate Conception
- 25 December – Christmas Day
- 26 December – Saint Stephen's Day

== See also ==
- 2027 in the European Union
- 2027 in Europe
