= 2024 Labour Party freebies controversy =

2024 controversy involving donations to Keir Starmer

In September 2024, British prime minister Keir Starmer faced controversy after reports that he had failed to declare a gift of several thousands pounds worth of clothes to his wife Victoria Starmer by Labour Party donor Lord Alli. Subsequent debate arose over the number of gifts accepted by Starmer during his time as leader of the Labour Party, with Reuters reporting that he had accepted more gifts than any other MP since 2019.

The controversy continued into October 2024, when it was reported that the Special Escort Group of London's Metropolitan Police had provided singer-songwriter Taylor Swift a top-level security service for her London Eras Tour shows in August following the Vienna terrorism plot, after the home secretary Yvette Cooper allegedly pressured them to offer the security after she, Starmer and several other senior members of his cabinet received over £20,000 in free tickets for the shows by Swift's team. Starmer and his government denied accusations that Cooper played a part in granting the security to Swift or pressuring the police to do so, or that the free tickets were gifted to the politicians in exchange for the security grant, maintaining that it was solely a police matter.

The controversy drew criticism from both opposition politicians and politicians from the governing Labour Party, with critics accusing Starmer's government of hypocrisy for accepting the gifts while pursuing economic austerity and cuts to welfare, with Labour MP Rosie Duffield resigning from the party in protest. Defenders of the government argued there was no wrongdoing as no legal rules had been broken and that political donations were normal. Starmer himself dismissed accusations of corruption, stating that all MPs accepted gifts and that he had to accept hospitality to attend shows for security reasons.

== Timeline ==
=== Acceptance of gifts ===
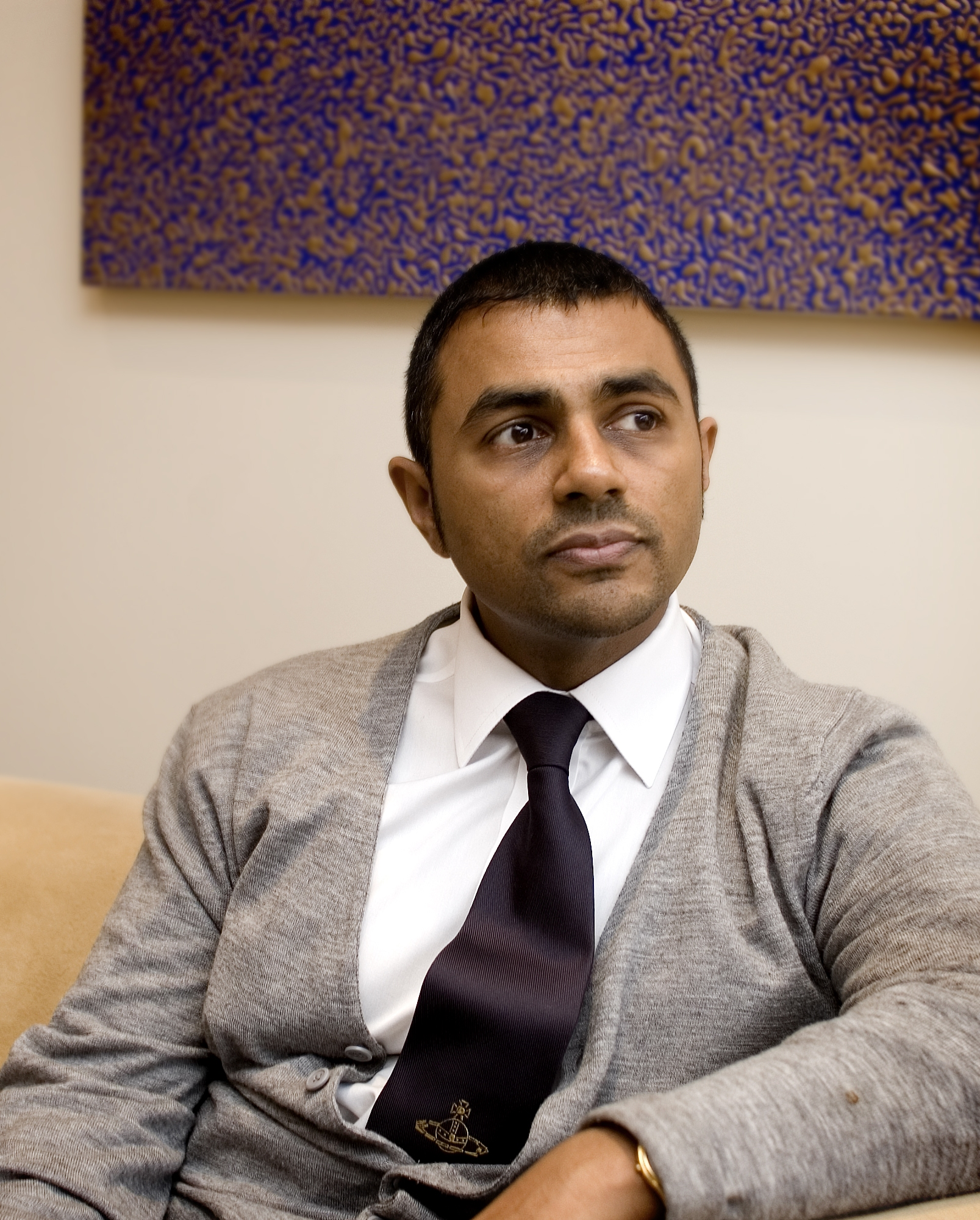
Waheed Alli, Baron Alli pictured in 2010

On 24 August 2024, in what has been dubbed the "passes for glasses" affair, The Times reported that, shortly after Starmer became the prime minister, Lord Alli, Starmer's biggest personal donor, had been given a security pass. The pass gave Alli unrestricted access to Downing Street, and he then hosted a party there for other Labour Party donors. This gave rise to suspicions of "cash for access" and claims of cronyism.

On 15 September 2024, reports emerged in the British media that Starmer had initially failed to declare £5,000 of gifts used to purchase clothes for his wife, Victoria Starmer. The gifts had been given by Waheed Alli, Baron Alli, who had also given Starmer a number of clothing-related gifts, including £2,435 worth of glasses, and had given Labour Deputy Leader Angela Rayner gifts worth £3,550 of clothes in June 2024. The donations, which included a personal shopper and clothing alterations, were said to have occurred both before and after the general election.

It was subsequently reported that Starmer had accepted over £107,145 worth of gifts, benefits, and hospitality since the 2019 general election, including tickets to Arsenal F.C. matches and concerts from Taylor Swift and Coldplay, two-and-a-half times more than any other MP. It was also reported that Health Secretary Wes Streeting had been gifted four Taylor Swift concert tickets, worth a total of £1,160, by The Football Association, and that Chancellor of the Exchequer Rachel Reeves had accepted £7,500 worth of clothes in 2024 from Juliet Rosenfeld, which were registered as donations "to support the shadow chancellor's office".

On 17 September, 10 Downing Street announced that Parliamentary Commissioner for Standards Daniel Greenberg would not investigate the gifts.

On Friday 20 September, as the 2024 Labour Party Conference was set to begin, Starmer as well as Reeves and Rayner announced they would no longer accept clothes from donors. That weekend, The Mail on Sunday reported that Secretary of State for Education Bridget Phillipson had received a £14,000 gift from Alli for her 40th birthday party.

Starmer subsequently admitted to accepting accommodation worth £20,000 from Lord Alli between May and July 2024, stating that the offer was for somewhere his son could study peacefully for his GCSEs. The exams that year finished in mid-June. Starmer's use of accommodation provided by Alli sparked further controversy when it was reported that a video calling for Brits to stay at home that Starmer had filmed in December 2021, during the third wave of the COVID-19 pandemic, had been filmed in a flat belonging to Alli. The Telegraph also reported that Deputy Prime Minister Angela Rayner faced an investigation by the parliamentary standards commissioner over the use of Alli's $2.5-million New York apartment.

On 27 September, The Guardian reported that Starmer had received an additional £16,000 worth of clothes as a gift from Alli in late 2023 and early 2024. Although those gifts had been declared in time, they had been declared as money "for the private office" of Starmer, and not as clothing.

=== Civic security for Taylor Swift ===
In October 2024, it was reported that singer-songwriter Taylor Swift was granted top-level special security protection from the Special Escort Group of the Metropolitan Police after Labour politicians including Starmer, his home secretary Yvette Cooper, his health secretary Wes Streeting, culture secretary Lisa Nandy and education secretary Bridget Phillipson were gifted with over £20,000 in free tickets to concerts for The Eras Tour in London in August 2024. Swift's team had requested the protection following the Vienna terrorism plot, which targeted one of her previous concerts in the same month.

In advance of the London shows, Swift's team had reportedly threatened to cancel the concerts if the security was not provided. The Metropolitan Police initially turned down the request, claiming their intelligence did not detect any threat to Swift's London shows and therefore did not believe she qualified for the top-level security, which is typically reserved for senior politicians, the British royal family and heads of state. However, the police subsequently reversed its decision and provided Swift with the requested protection after Cooper reportedly discussed the matter with the police. Cooper's husband, former Labour politician Ed Balls, also received free tickets for the tour. Nandy denied that Cooper had intervened for the police to grant the request and said it was "an operational decision for the police", while 10 Downing Street also denied accusations that the tickets were offered to the politicians by Swift's team in return for the security protection.

== Analysis ==
George Eaton of the New Statesman argued on 18 September 2024 that the controversy could not be described as a scandal, as no Parliamentary rules were broken nor was there clear evidence that any improper favour had been sought by those who offered Starmer gifts. However, Eaton argued that the controversy still posed a political problem for Labour, as it left them facing accusations of hypocrisy and that it risked conflicting with the government's message of budget austerity. By 3 October, Oliver Wright, policy editor for The Times, said that the controversy had "snowballed into a scandal that has left the prime minister's authority in tatters".

Rob Picheta of CNN argued that the controversy gained traction because it "coincided awkwardly with a cut to the Winter Fuel Payment" that was also controversial. Picheta also argued that the controversy contributed to a significant "collapse in Starmer’s popularity since his election win," pointing to a 21 September Opinium Research poll that found Starmer's net approval rating to have fallen to -26%, a drop of 45 percentage points since the start of Starmer's term as prime minister.

Sam Power of the University of Bristol wrote that, although the public may not interpret the gifts as evidence that the government would change policy for donors, the controversy did "speak to a general sense of unfairness – that the very rich have a proximity to power that others simply don’t."

Daniel Boffey of The Guardian wrote that "the issue of clothing and image has been a central cause" of discomfort for the partners of prime ministers in British history, due to their high profile in the media.

== Reactions ==
Starmer stated that there was a "massive difference between declarations and corruption," saying that "all MPs get gifts" and that as Prime Minister, he "can't go into the stands because of security reasons. Therefore, if I don't accept a gift of hospitality, I can't go to a game."

Members of Starmer's cabinet defended his actions. Chancellor of the Duchy of Lancaster Pat McFadden said that Starmer "will, and does, conduct himself with integrity" and that the controversy was "because of taking advice and trying to make sure you abide by the rules." Foreign Secretary David Lammy stated that successive prime ministers "do rely on political donations so they can look their best both in the hope of representing the country, if you're in the opposition, or as prime minister." Health Secretary Wes Streeting stated that he was "proud" of people who contributed "their money to our politics," describing it as "a noble pursuit just like giving to charity." Business Secretary Jonathan Reynolds said that he had "no problem" with the acceptance of gifts that can be of "a more personal nature" opining that hard-working politicians were entitled to "a bit of relaxation".

Labour backbencher Rosie Duffield resigned the Labour whip over the row, accusing her government of pursuing "cruel and unnecessary" policies and accused Starmer of "hypocrisy" for accepting gifts. In her resignation letter she accused Starmer and senior Labour MPs of "sleaze, nepotism and apparent avarice" which are "off the scale". She added "I'm so ashamed of what you and your inner circle have done to tarnish and humiliate our once proud party". Another Labour backbencher, and Mother of the House, former Shadow Home Secretary Diane Abbott said that under the leadership of Starmer, the Labour Party is now "in the pocket of millionaires".

Former Labour Party Deputy Leader Baroness Harman criticised Starmer's response to the controversy, saying that Starmer was "not a sort of money focused, greedy type person," but that "doubling down and trying to justify it is making things worse." Former Labour Shadow Chancellor of the Exchequer John McDonnell criticised Starmer for accepting the gifts while "talking about tough decisions and painful policies coming and possibly a new wave of austerity," adding that Labour Party founder Keir Hardie attended Parliament in "an ordinary working man’s suit instead of the usual formal dress and he did so because he wanted to make the point that we represent working people." The Guardian published an editorial warning that the Labour government did not have the benefit of a political honeymoon and that it was "hard to believe that a leader who laid such stress on the need to rebuild trust in politics should behave so naively."

Susan Hall of the Conservative Party, also chair of the Police and Crime Committee on the Greater London Assembly, demanded an official investigation into the issue of civic security for Swift, calling it "highly concerning" that government officials intervened to change the police's decision. Minister Ellie Reeves and sister of Chancellor Rachel Reeves did not answer the Conservative Member of Parliaments' questions regarding the controversy in the Parliament of the United Kingdom. Gavin Williamson stated that the Labour government has compromised the operational independence of the police, while Andrew Murrison asserted that "the Special Escort Group needs to be used sparingly and not to ferry entertainers around". The prime minister's office denied that the free tickets were connected to security demands, however admitted that Starmer meeting Swift at the concert could have created a perception of a conflict of interest. Former prime minister Boris Johnson said Swift has made the United Kingdom "look like a banana republic"; Rebecca Reid of i said "the Eras tour has been dragged into a tangential political row" and criticised Johnson of not caring about women's safety; Reid opined that Swift deserves the police convoy in light of the Vienna threat and the Southport stabbing incident.

== See also ==
- List of political scandals in the United Kingdom
