= Vienna South West (National Council electoral district) =

Parliamentary electoral district in Austria

- Wien Süd-West
- Electoral District for the National Council
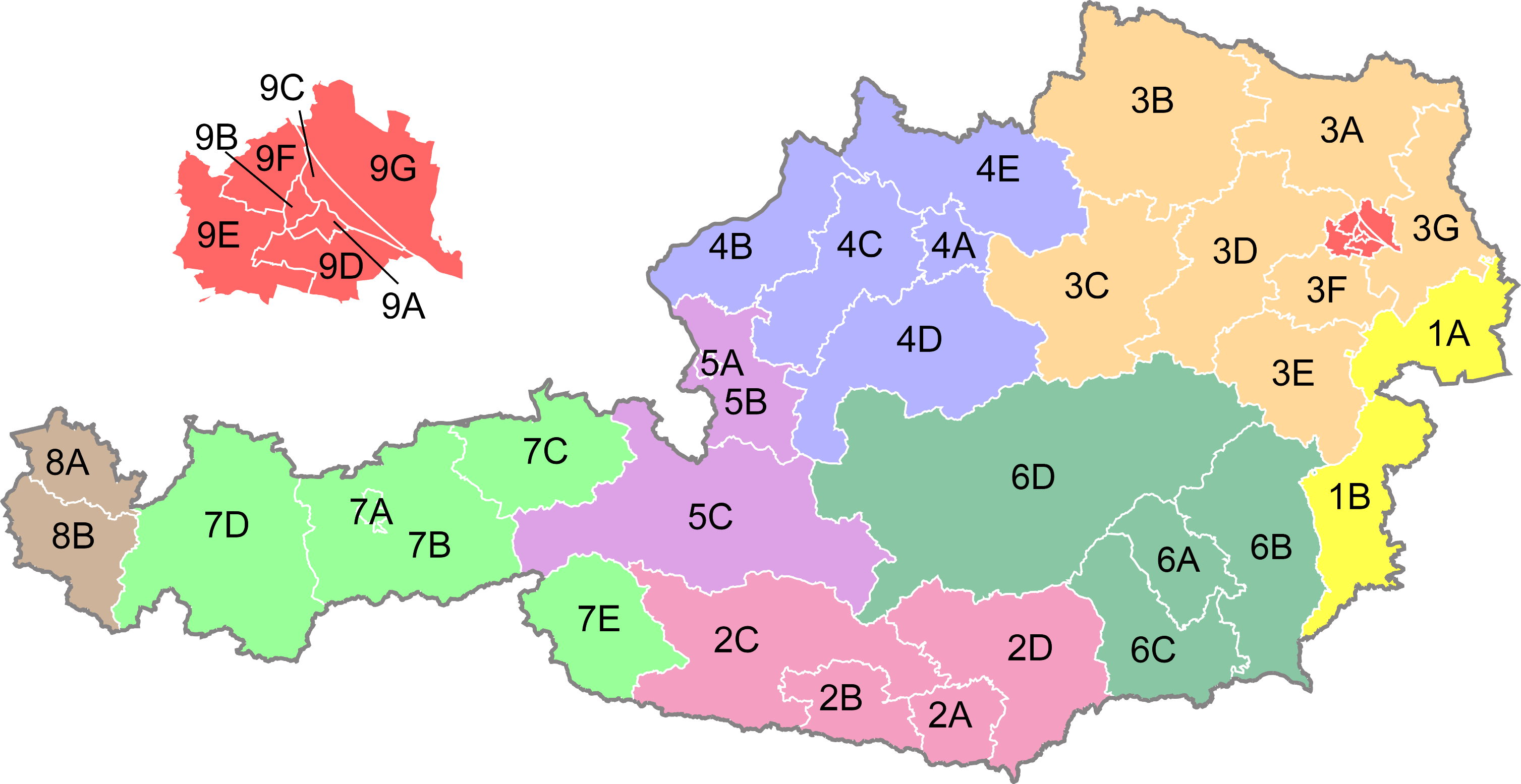
- The 39 regional electotral districts
- District: List: Hietzing; Liesing; Penzing; Rudolfsheim-Fünfhaus
- State: Vienna
- Population: 351,350 (2024)
- Electorate: 210,813 (2019)
- Area: 107 km^{2} (2023)

Current Electoral District
- Created: 1994
- Seats: 6 (1994–present)
- Members: List: Doris Bures (SPÖ); Ewa Ernst-Dziedzic (GRÜNE); Wolfgang Gerstl (ÖVP)
- Created from: Vienna

Vienna South West (German: Wien Süd-West), also known as Electoral District 9E (German: Wahlkreis 9E), is one of the 39 multi-member regional electoral districts of the National Council, the lower house of the Austrian Parliament, the national legislature of Austria. The electoral district was created in 1992 when electoral regulations were amended to add regional electoral districts to the existing state-wide electoral districts and came into being at the following legislative election in 1994. It consists of the districts of Hietzing, Liesing, Penzing and Rudolfsheim-Fünfhaus in the city-state of Vienna. The electoral district currently elects six of the 183 members of the National Council using the open party-list proportional representation electoral system. At the 2019 legislative election the constituency had 210,813 registered electors.

== History ==
Vienna South West was one 43 regional electoral districts (regionalwahlkreise) established by the "National Council Electoral Regulations 1992" (Nationalrats-Wahlordnung 1992) passed by the National Council in 1992. It consisted of the districts of Hietzing, Liesing, Penzing and Rudolfsheim-Fünfhaus in the city-state of Vienna. The district was initially allocated six seats in May 1993.

== Electoral system ==
Vienna South West currently elects six of the 183 members of the National Council using the open party-list proportional representation electoral system. The allocation of seats is carried out in three stages. In the first stage, seats are allocated to parties (lists) at the regional level using a state-wide Hare quota (wahlzahl) (valid votes in the state divided by the number of seats in the state). In the second stage, seats are allocated to parties at the state/provincial level using the state-wide Hare quota (any seats won by the party at the regional stage are subtracted from the party's state seats). In the third and final stage, seats are allocated to parties at the federal/national level using the D'Hondt method (any seats won by the party at the regional and state stages are subtracted from the party's federal seats). Only parties that reach the 4% national threshold, or have won a seat at the regional stage, compete for seats at the state and federal stages.

Electors may cast one preferential vote for individual candidates at the regional, state and federal levels. Split-ticket voting (panachage), or voting for more than one candidate at each level, is not permitted and will result in the ballot paper being invalidated. At the regional level, candidates must receive preferential votes amounting to at least 14% of the valid votes cast for their party to over-ride the order of the party list (10% and 7% respectively for the state and federal levels). Prior to April 2013 electors could not cast preferential votes at the federal level and the thresholds candidates needed to over-ride the party list order were higher at the regional level (half the Hare quota or 1/6 of the party votes) and state level (Hare quota).

== Election results ==
=== Summary ===
Election	Communists KPÖ+ / KPÖ			Social Democrats SPÖ			Greens GRÜNE			NEOS NEOS / LiF			People's ÖVP			Freedom FPÖ		
Election	Votes	%	Seats	Votes	%	Seats	Votes	%	Seats	Votes	%	Seats	Votes	%	Seats	Votes	%	Seats
2019	1,055	0.68%	0	39,173	25.20%	1	31,487	20.26%	1	16,542	10.64%	0	42,245	27.18%	1	18,858	12.13%	0
2017	2,001	1.23%	0	52,482	32.22%	1	9,263	5.69%	0	11,517	7.07%	0	40,216	24.69%	1	33,029	20.27%	1
2013	2,207	1.47%	0	45,103	29.95%	1	23,939	15.90%	0	12,533	8.32%	0	26,075	17.32%	1	28,746	19.09%	1
2008	1,509	0.95%	0	52,650	33.30%	2	25,055	15.85%	0	6,711	4.24%	0	31,060	19.64%	1	29,725	18.80%	1
2006	1,657	1.09%	0	59,086	38.74%	2	26,480	17.36%	1				38,521	25.25%	1	19,686	12.91%	0
2002	845	0.53%	0	65,746	41.29%	2	23,323	14.65%	0	1,798	1.13%	0	54,156	34.01%	2	12,323	7.74%	0
1999	1,123	0.74%	0	55,092	36.51%	2	15,428	10.22%	0	10,404	6.89%	0	29,300	19.42%	1	36,141	23.95%	1
1995	550	0.33%	0	69,182	41.79%	2	9,787	5.91%	0	14,984	9.05%	0	36,721	22.18%	1	32,120	19.40%	1
1994	585	0.37%	0	57,837	36.93%	2	15,239	9.73%	0	16,869	10.77%	0	29,332	18.73%	1	34,521	22.04%	1

=== Detailed ===
==== 2010s ====
===== 2019 =====
Results of the 2019 legislative election held on 29 September 2019:

Party		Votes per district					Total votes	%	Seats
Party		Hiet- zing	Lie- sing	Pen- zing	Rudolfs- heim- Fünf- haus	Voting card	Total votes	%	Seats
Austrian People's Party	ÖVP	10,084	15,392	11,371	4,665	733	42,245	27.18%	1
Social Democratic Party of Austria	SPÖ	5,624	14,631	10,824	7,592	502	39,173	25.20%	1
The Greens – The Green Alternative	GRÜNE	5,716	8,265	9,373	7,449	684	31,487	20.26%	1
Freedom Party of Austria	FPÖ	2,768	7,969	5,124	2,705	292	18,858	12.13%	0
NEOS – The New Austria	NEOS	4,181	5,491	4,552	1,976	342	16,542	10.64%	0
JETZT	JETZT	878	1,395	1,276	797	100	4,446	2.86%	0
KPÖ Plus	KPÖ+	128	322	290	303	12	1,055	0.68%	0
The Beer Party	BIER	126	341	259	134	15	875	0.56%	0
Der Wandel	WANDL	92	228	247	179	16	762	0.49%	0
Valid Votes		29,597	54,034	43,316	25,800	2,696	155,443	100.00%	3
Rejected Votes		186	402	365	175	14	1,142	0.73%	
Total Polled		29,783	54,436	43,681	25,975	2,710	156,585	74.28%	
Registered Electors		38,030	73,679	59,858	39,246		210,813		
Turnout		78.31%	73.88%	72.97%	66.19%		74.28%		

The following candidates were elected:

- Personal mandates - Doris Bures (SPÖ), 7,102 votes.
- Party mandates - Ewa Ernst-Dziedzic (GRÜNE), 1,563 votes; and Wolfgang Gerstl (ÖVP), 2,968 votes.

===== 2017 =====
Results of the 2017 legislative election held on 15 October 2017:

Party		Votes per district					Total votes	%	Seats
Party		Hiet- zing	Lie- sing	Pen- zing	Rudolfs- heim- Fünf- haus	Voting card	Total votes	%	Seats
Social Democratic Party of Austria	SPÖ	8,019	18,248	14,754	10,679	782	52,482	32.22%	1
Austrian People's Party	ÖVP	10,739	13,578	10,789	4,448	662	40,216	24.69%	1
Freedom Party of Austria	FPÖ	4,633	13,671	9,101	5,165	459	33,029	20.27%	1
Peter Pilz List	PILZ	2,376	3,685	3,639	2,466	237	12,403	7.61%	0
NEOS – The New Austria	NEOS	3,014	3,573	3,181	1,490	259	11,517	7.07%	0
The Greens – The Green Alternative	GRÜNE	1,734	2,137	2,770	2,400	222	9,263	5.69%	0
Communist Party of Austria	KPÖ	274	460	537	692	38	2,001	1.23%	0
My Vote Counts!	GILT	191	495	412	231	21	1,350	0.83%	0
The Whites	WEIßE	31	63	52	29	5	180	0.11%	0
Free List Austria	FLÖ	32	54	39	17	1	143	0.09%	0
Homeless in Politics	ODP	26	43	34	37	1	141	0.09%	0
EU Exit Party	EUAUS	17	38	36	28	1	120	0.07%	0
Socialist Left Party	SLP	9	17	11	27	1	65	0.04%	0
Valid Votes		31,095	56,062	45,355	27,709	2,689	162,910	100.00%	3
Rejected Votes		174	399	301	263	16	1,153	0.70%	
Total Polled		31,269	56,461	45,656	27,972	2,705	164,063	78.01%	
Registered Electors		38,353	71,666	60,022	40,271		210,312		
Turnout		81.53%	78.78%	76.07%	69.46%		78.01%		

The following candidates were elected:

- Party mandates - Doris Bures (SPÖ), 6,371 votes; Wolfgang Gerstl (ÖVP), 3,702 votes; and Markus Tschank (FPÖ), 1,510 votes.

===== 2013 =====
Results of the 2013 legislative election held on 29 September 2013:

Party		Votes per district					Total votes	%	Seats
Party		Hiet- zing	Lie- sing	Pen- zing	Rudolfs- heim- Fünf- haus	Voting card	Total votes	%	Seats
Social Democratic Party of Austria	SPÖ	6,455	17,474	12,139	8,420	615	45,103	29.95%	1
Freedom Party of Austria	FPÖ	4,072	11,358	8,278	4,680	358	28,746	19.09%	1
Austrian People's Party	ÖVP	7,827	7,752	7,123	2,862	511	26,075	17.32%	1
The Greens – The Green Alternative	GRÜNE	4,471	6,291	7,004	5,614	559	23,939	15.90%	0
NEOS – The New Austria	NEOS	3,438	3,834	3,435	1,580	246	12,533	8.32%	0
Team Stronach	FRANK	1,138	2,220	1,726	916	82	6,082	4.04%	0
Alliance for the Future of Austria	BZÖ	836	1,453	1,145	489	98	4,021	2.67%	0
Communist Party of Austria	KPÖ	362	576	682	562	25	2,207	1.47%	0
Pirate Party of Austria	PIRAT	276	422	422	315	19	1,454	0.97%	0
Der Wandel	WANDL	34	63	74	81	5	257	0.17%	0
Socialist Left Party	SLP	33	35	52	46	1	167	0.11%	0
Valid Votes		28,942	51,478	42,080	25,565	2,519	150,584	100.00%	3
Rejected Votes		340	700	644	394	36	2,114	1.38%	
Total Polled		29,282	52,178	42,724	25,959	2,555	152,698	72.21%	
Registered Electors		38,778	70,939	60,622	41,115		211,454		
Turnout		75.51%	73.55%	70.48%	63.14%		72.21%		

The following candidates were elected:

- Personal mandates - Sebastian Kurz (ÖVP), 10,272 votes.
- Party mandates - Doris Bures (SPÖ), 4,147 votes; and Johannes Hübner (FPÖ), 1,653 votes.

Doris Bures (SPÖ) and Sebastian Kurz (ÖVP) resigned on 16 December 2013 and were replaced by Laura Rudas (SPÖ) and Erwin Rasinger (ÖVP) respectively on 17 December 2013. Laura Rudas (SPÖ) resigned on 17 March 2014 and was replaced by Sabine Oberhauser (SPÖ) on 18 March 2014.

==== 2000s ====
===== 2008 =====
Results of the 2008 legislative election held on 28 September 2008:

Party		Votes per district					Total votes	%	Seats
Party		Hiet- zing	Lie- sing	Pen- zing	Rudolfs- heim- Fünf- haus	Voting card	Total votes	%	Seats
Social Democratic Party of Austria	SPÖ	7,649	19,046	14,030	9,812	2,113	52,650	33.30%	2
Austrian People's Party	ÖVP	9,587	8,903	7,985	3,051	1,534	31,060	19.64%	1
Freedom Party of Austria	FPÖ	4,142	11,022	8,270	5,233	1,058	29,725	18.80%	1
The Greens – The Green Alternative	GRÜNE	5,079	6,823	7,172	4,972	1,009	25,055	15.85%	0
Alliance for the Future of Austria	BZÖ	1,381	2,916	2,111	1,029	379	7,816	4.94%	0
Liberal Forum	LiF	1,545	1,964	1,837	1,088	277	6,711	4.24%	0
Communist Party of Austria	KPÖ	218	461	399	380	51	1,509	0.95%	0
Fritz Dinkhauser List – Citizens' Forum Tyrol	FRITZ	259	460	377	192	74	1,362	0.86%	0
Independent Citizens' Initiative Save Austria	RETTÖ	190	317	297	158	37	999	0.63%	0
The Christians	DC	110	203	180	136	24	653	0.41%	0
Animal Rights Party	TRP	68	137	114	63	13	395	0.25%	0
Left	LINKE	19	51	46	52	4	172	0.11%	0
Valid Votes		30,247	52,303	42,818	26,166	6,573	158,107	100.00%	4
Rejected Votes		415	743	725	409	82	2,374	1.48%	
Total Polled		30,662	53,046	43,543	26,575	6,655	160,481	75.61%	
Registered Electors		39,979	70,042	61,088	41,139		212,248		
Turnout		76.70%	75.73%	71.28%	64.60%		75.61%		

The following candidates were elected:

- Personal mandates - Wolfgang Schüssel (ÖVP), 9,879 votes.
- Party mandates - Doris Bures (SPÖ), 5,961 votes; Johannes Hübner (FPÖ), 1,614 votes; and Andreas Schieder (SPÖ), 1,245 votes.

Doris Bures (SPÖ) and Andreas Schieder (SPÖ) resigned on 2 December 2008 and were replaced by Laura Rudas (SPÖ) and Wolfgang Katzian (SPÖ) respectively on 3 December 2008. Wolfgang Schüssel (ÖVP) resigned on 8 September 2011 and was replaced by Wolfgang Gerstl (ÖVP) on 9 September 2011.

===== 2006 =====
Results of the 2006 legislative election held on 1 October 2006:

Party		Votes per district					Total votes	%	Seats
Party		Hiet- zing	Lie- sing	Pen- zing	Rudolfs- heim- Fünf- haus	Voting card	Total votes	%	Seats
Social Democratic Party of Austria	SPÖ	8,199	20,145	15,164	10,849	4,729	59,086	38.74%	2
Austrian People's Party	ÖVP	10,132	10,741	9,253	3,812	4,583	38,521	25.25%	1
The Greens – The Green Alternative	GRÜNE	5,288	6,939	7,049	4,552	2,652	26,480	17.36%	1
Freedom Party of Austria	FPÖ	2,817	6,571	5,483	3,533	1,282	19,686	12.91%	0
Hans-Peter Martin's List	MATIN	521	1,174	948	471	296	3,410	2.24%	0
Alliance for the Future of Austria	BZÖ	453	943	698	429	224	2,747	1.80%	0
Communist Party of Austria	KPÖ	249	501	419	371	117	1,657	1.09%	0
EU Withdrawal – Neutral Free Austria	NFÖ	99	188	152	76	51	566	0.37%	0
Socialist Left Party	SLP	57	103	93	103	24	380	0.25%	0
Valid Votes		27,815	47,305	39,259	24,196	13,958	152,533	100.00%	4
Rejected Votes		334	547	497	290	105	1,773	1.15%	
Total Polled		28,149	47,852	39,756	24,486	14,063	154,306	74.54%	
Registered Electors		39,638	67,471	59,485	40,414		207,008		
Turnout		71.02%	70.92%	66.83%	60.59%		74.54%		

The following candidates were elected:

- Personal mandates - Eva Glawischnig (GRÜNE), 7,854 votes.
- Party mandates - Doris Bures (SPÖ), 5,838 votes; Erwin Rasinger (Note: Wolfgang Schüssel was the ÖVP's first placed candidate in Vienna South West but, as he was elected on the ÖVP's federal list, the second placed candidate Erwin Rasinger was elected in Vienna South West.) (ÖVP), 673 votes; and Andreas Schieder (SPÖ), 1,726 votes.

Doris Bures (SPÖ) resigned on 15 January 2007 and was replaced by Laura Rudas (SPÖ) on 16 January 2007. Andreas Schieder (SPÖ) resigned on 2 July 2008 and was replaced by Laura Rudas (SPÖ) whose vacant seat was filled by Doris Bures (SPÖ) on 3 July 2008.

===== 2002 =====
Results of the 2002 legislative election held on 24 November 2002:

Party		Votes per district					Total votes	%	Seats
Party		Hiet- zing	Lie- sing	Pen- zing	Rudolfs- heim- Fünf- haus	Voting card	Total votes	%	Seats
Social Democratic Party of Austria	SPÖ	9,747	22,684	17,620	12,136	3,559	65,746	41.29%	2
Austrian People's Party	ÖVP	13,469	16,153	13,999	6,680	3,855	54,156	34.01%	2
The Greens – The Green Alternative	GRÜNE	4,600	6,164	6,405	4,408	1,746	23,323	14.65%	0
Freedom Party of Austria	FPÖ	2,106	3,822	3,358	2,411	626	12,323	7.74%	0
Liberal Forum	LiF	308	585	506	307	92	1,798	1.13%	0
Communist Party of Austria	KPÖ	132	290	220	171	32	845	0.53%	0
Socialist Left Party	SLP	107	201	188	175	8	679	0.43%	0
The Democrats		57	105	117	70	15	364	0.23%	0
Valid Votes		30,526	50,004	42,413	26,358	9,933	159,234	100.00%	4
Rejected Votes		272	466	492	277	65	1,572	0.98%	
Total Polled		30,798	50,470	42,905	26,635	9,998	160,806	80.00%	
Registered Electors		39,078	64,815	57,810	39,315		201,018		
Turnout		78.81%	77.87%	74.22%	67.75%		80.00%		

The following candidates were elected:

- Personal mandates - Wolfgang Schüssel (ÖVP), 26,139 votes.
- Party mandates - Doris Bures (SPÖ), 7,033 votes; Erwin Rasinger (ÖVP), 799 votes; and Peter Schieder (SPÖ), 1,800 votes.

Wolfgang Schüssel (ÖVP) resigned on 4 March 2003 and was replaced by Roderich Regler (ÖVP) on 5 March 2003.

==== 1990s ====
===== 1999 =====
Results of the 1999 legislative election held on 3 October 1999:

Party		Votes per district					Total votes	%	Seats
Party		Hiet- zing	Lie- sing	Pen- zing	Rudolfs- heim- Fünf- haus	Voting card	Total votes	%	Seats
Social Democratic Party of Austria	SPÖ	8,748	17,713	14,407	9,817	4,407	55,092	36.51%	2
Freedom Party of Austria	FPÖ	5,960	11,118	9,647	6,631	2,785	36,141	23.95%	1
Austrian People's Party	ÖVP	8,268	7,642	7,145	3,110	3,135	29,300	19.42%	1
The Greens – The Green Alternative	GRÜNE	3,131	4,076	4,173	2,598	1,450	15,428	10.22%	0
Liberal Forum	LiF	2,353	2,827	2,730	1,521	973	10,404	6.89%	0
The Independents	DU	398	790	717	489	224	2,618	1.73%	0
Communist Party of Austria	KPÖ	186	340	284	249	64	1,123	0.74%	0
No to NATO and EU – Neutral Austria Citizens' Initiative	NEIN	166	224	214	150	41	795	0.53%	0
Valid Votes		29,210	44,730	39,317	24,565	13,079	150,901	100.00%	4
Rejected Votes		390	635	526	374	103	2,028	1.33%	
Total Polled		29,600	45,365	39,843	24,939	13,182	152,929	75.81%	
Registered Electors		41,198	62,371	58,228	39,925		201,722		
Turnout		71.85%	72.73%	68.43%	62.46%		75.81%		

The following candidates were elected:

- Personal mandates - Wolfgang Schüssel (ÖVP), 9,331 votes.
- Party mandates - Doris Bures (SPÖ), 2,637 votes; Herbert Scheibner (FPÖ), 3,916 votes; and Peter Schieder (SPÖ), 1,246 votes.

Wolfgang Schüssel (ÖVP) resigned on 7 February 2000 and was replaced by Martina Pecher (ÖVP) on 8 February 2000. Herbert Scheibner (FPÖ) resigned on 10 February 2000 and was replaced by Wolfgang Jung (FPÖ).

===== 1995 =====
Results of the 1995 legislative election held on 17 December 1995:

Party		Votes per district					Total votes	%	Seats
Party		Hiet- zing	Lie- sing	Pen- zing	Rudolfs- heim- Fünf- haus	Voting card	Total votes	%	Seats
Social Democratic Party of Austria	SPÖ	11,312	22,229	18,782	13,669	3,190	69,182	41.79%	2
Austrian People's Party	ÖVP	10,797	9,847	9,519	4,477	2,081	36,721	22.18%	1
Freedom Party of Austria	FPÖ	5,261	9,635	8,925	6,869	1,430	32,120	19.40%	1
Liberal Forum	LiF	3,219	4,691	4,098	2,198	778	14,984	9.05%	0
The Greens – The Green Alternative	GRÜNE	1,896	2,580	2,767	1,985	559	9,787	5.91%	0
No – Civic Action Group; Against the Sale of Austria	NEIN	346	544	549	363	87	1,889	1.14%	0
Communist Party of Austria	KPÖ	94	202	135	100	19	550	0.33%	0
Natural Law Party	ÖNP	80	87	89	55	12	323	0.20%	0
Valid Votes		33,005	49,815	44,864	29,716	8,156	165,556	100.00%	4
Rejected Votes		455	743	797	444	59	2,498	1.49%	
Total Polled		33,460	50,558	45,661	30,160	8,215	168,054	81.11%	
Registered Electors		42,475	62,480	60,148	42,080		207,183		
Turnout		78.78%	80.92%	75.91%	71.67%		81.11%		

The following candidates were elected:

- Party mandates - Doris Bures (SPÖ), 2,923 votes; Herbert Scheibner (FPÖ), 821 votes; Peter Schieder (SPÖ), 1,783 votes; and Ingrid Tichy-Schreder (Note: Wolfgang Schüssel was the ÖVP's first placed candidate in Vienna South West but, as he was elected on the ÖVP's federal list, the second placed candidate Ingrid Tichy-Schreder was elected in Vienna South West.) (ÖVP), 482 votes.

===== 1994 =====
Results of the 1994 legislative election held on 9 October 1994:

Party		Votes per district					Total votes	%	Seats
Party		Hiet- zing	Lie- sing	Pen- zing	Rudolfs- heim- Fünf- haus	Voting card	Total votes	%	Seats
Social Democratic Party of Austria	SPÖ	9,463	18,143	15,316	11,065	3,850	57,837	36.93%	2
Freedom Party of Austria	FPÖ	5,844	9,935	9,321	6,952	2,469	34,521	22.04%	1
Austrian People's Party	ÖVP	8,307	7,371	7,297	3,601	2,756	29,332	18.73%	1
Liberal Forum	LiF	3,743	5,207	4,362	2,290	1,267	16,869	10.77%	0
The Greens – The Green Alternative	GRÜNE	3,205	4,054	4,136	2,691	1,153	15,239	9.73%	0
No – Civic Action Group; Against the Sale of Austria	NEIN	248	465	511	287	161	1,672	1.07%	0
Communist Party of Austria	KPÖ	110	188	142	112	33	585	0.37%	0
Natural Law Party	ÖNP	58	75	74	43	14	264	0.17%	0
Citizen Greens Austria – Free Democrats	BGÖ	48	34	34	21	10	147	0.09%	0
United Greens Austria – List Adi Pinter	VGÖ	32	35	39	29	7	142	0.09%	0
Valid Votes		31,058	45,507	41,232	27,091	11,720	156,608	100.00%	4
Rejected Votes		424	681	723	415	96	2,339	1.47%	
Total Polled		31,482	46,188	41,955	27,506	11,816	158,947	75.43%	
Registered Electors		43,274	62,741	61,303	43,408		210,726		
Turnout		72.75%	73.62%	68.44%	63.37%		75.43%		

The following candidates were elected:

- Personal mandates - Wolfgang Schüssel (ÖVP), 7,919 votes.
- Party mandates - Doris Bures (SPÖ), 2,811 votes; Herbert Scheibner (FPÖ), 1,103 votes; and Peter Schieder (SPÖ), 1,857 votes.

Wolfgang Schüssel (ÖVP) resigned on 12 December 1994 and was replaced by Ingrid Tichy-Schreder (ÖVP) on 15 December 1994.
