= Markus Tschank =

Austrian politician (born 1979)

Member of the National Council
- Incumbent
- Assumed office 24 October 2024
- In office 9 November 2017 – 22 October 2019
- Constituency: Vienna South West

Personal details
- Born: 6 January 1979 (age 47)
- Party: Freedom Party

Markus Tschank (born 6 January 1979) is an Austrian politician of the Freedom Party. He was elected member of the National Council in the 2024 legislative election, having previously been a member from 2017 to 2019.
