= Franz Sauerzopf =

Austrian politician (1932–2024)

Member of the Landtag Burgenland
- In office 3 November 1972 – 27 January 1986

Personal details
- Born: 17 May 1932 Mattersburg, Austria
- Died: 1 September 2024 (aged 92)
- Party: ÖVP
- Education: University of Vienna; Vienna University of Economics and Business
- Occupation: Judge

Franz Sauerzopf (17 May 1932 – 1 September 2024) was an Austrian judge and politician. A member of the Austrian People's Party, he served in the Landtag Burgenland from 1972 to 1986.

Sauerzopf died on 1 September 2024, at the age of 92.
