= Heinrich Schmelz =

Austrian politician (1930–2024)

Heinrich Schmelz (German pronunciation: [ˈhaɪnʁɪç ˈʃmɛlts]; 24 February 1930 – 7 September 2024) was an Austrian politician (Austrian People's Party) and federal civil servant. Schmelz was member of the Austrian Parliament from 1977 to 1988. Schmelz was born in Vienna on 24 February 1930, and died in Vienna on 7 September 2024, at the age of 94.
