= Hipp Holding =

Swiss baby food manufacturer

Hipp Holding AG
- Industry: Food industry
- Founded: 1 July 1932
- Headquarters: Sachseln (OW), Switzerland
- Key people: Stefan Hipp, Sebastian Hipp (CEO)
- Revenue: 608,0 mil. Euro (2020)
- Number of employees: 3200 (2023)

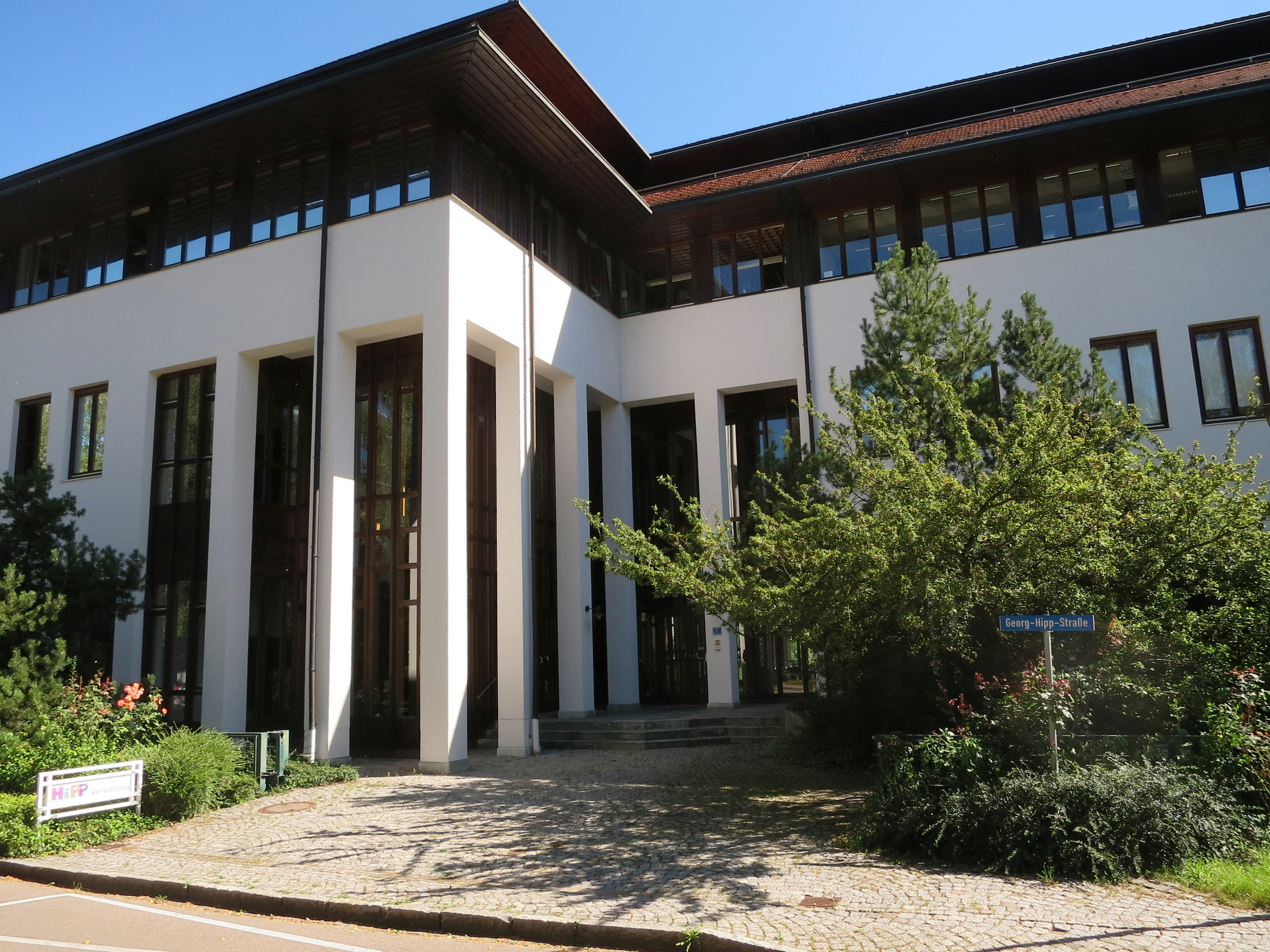
Main entrance of the administration building in Pfaffenhofen

Hipp Holding is a Swiss manufacturer of baby food and personal care products for babies based in Sachseln. The German company headquarters are in Pfaffenhofen an der Ilm in Upper Bavaria. This is also the origin and seat of the German main factory, which was founded in 1932.

== History ==
In 1899, Joseph Hipp (1867–1926) started producing rusk flour in his bakery, which had been part of the gingerbread bakers that had existed in Pfaffenhofen for centuries, which his son Georg Hipp (1905–1967) sold in Munich starting in 1921. Later, the company switched production mainly to "J. Hipp's children's rusk flour", but the gingerbread and wax-drawing workshops continued to operate. After the death of Joseph Hipp, Georg Hipp took over the production of the rusk flour and his mother Maria added a café to the business. In 1932 the business was split up, and his brother Hans Hipp took over the café, which along with the confectionery and gingerbread shop still exists today.

Georg Hipp founded the company "Nährmittel Hipp" on 1 July 1932. That same year he began to produce baby food in a former hops hall on part of today's company premises. Because of problems with the National Socialists, production was moved to Munich. When the buildings were destroyed in an air raid in 1944, Hipp settled back in Pfaffenhofen. There the company developed into a leading company in the food industry.

From the mid-1950s, Hipp was the first company in Germany to industrially produce baby food in cans, but for hygienic reasons of the fruit and vegetable menus have been in jars since 1959/1960.

In 1964, Georg's son Claus Hipp joined his father's business and he took over management in 1967. For a long time the management consisted of the three brothers Claus Hipp, Georg Johannes Hipp and Paulus Hipp. Georg Johannes Hipp left in 2010, and over time other family members joined.

In 2016, Hipp took over the plant of the dairy industry company Herford GmbH & Co. KG (MIG) from the DMK subsidiary Humana GmbH in Herford. Milk powder and baby food are manufactured there.

A recall of Hipp baby food from Spar stores in Austria and Germany was initiated on April 17, 2026, due to concerns that glass packaging might have been contaminated with poison. On April 18, 2026, it was reported that rat poison had been found in a glass jar of vegetable puree in Austria, Czech Republic and Slovakia.

== Group headquarters in Sachseln, Switzerland ==
In 1999, the company's headquarters were relocated to Sachseln, Switzerland, where the Hipp family has been active since 1954 with bio-familia AG, which specializes in organic muesli.

=== Founding of Somalon ===
The history of the subsidiary Somalon is preceded by personal relationships between the couple who founded the company. The Swiss Anny Metzner and the German Georg Hipp met in the canton of Obwalden. The couple often made pilgrimages to holy Brother Klaus in the Flüeli-Ranft pilgrimage site above Sachseln. In Germany, the Hipp family was already successful with baby food. To strengthen Obwalden as a business location and to market baby food from Sachseln, they founded the Somalon company in 1954. The lawyer Caspar Arquint became the director.

=== Creation of bio-familia AG ===
Personal contact with Edwin Bircher, the son of the muesli inventor Max Bircher-Benner, gave rise to the idea of producing ready-to-eat Birchermüesli in Sachseln. Bircher gave the Somalon company permission to call its product "Bio-Birchermüesli" and in 1959 it launched the first Birchermüesli under the brand name "familia". The organic Bircher muesli was successful and was exported to Germany, Austria, England, the Netherlands and the US within a short period of time. As a result, the company was renamed from Somalon to bio-familia in 1978. As late as 1987, the foreign share was 70 percent, but it fell to 40 percent by 2008 as the company was growing. Bio-familia AG is a founding member of the Bio Switzerland interest group (IG Bio), which was founded in 2015. The products are produced both for the company's own brand and for the house brands of major distributors.

== Pictures of the production site in Pfaffenhofen ==
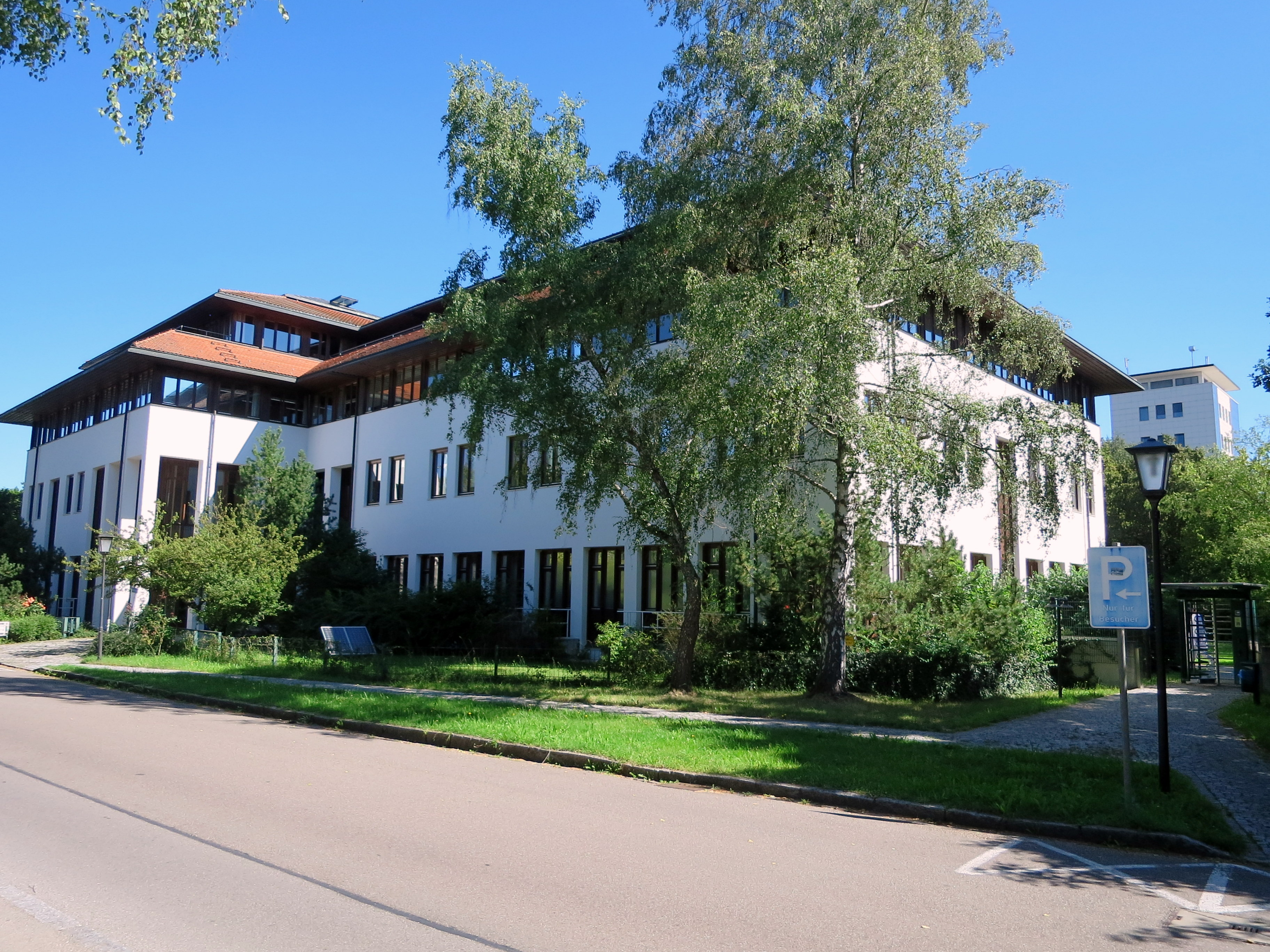
The administration building

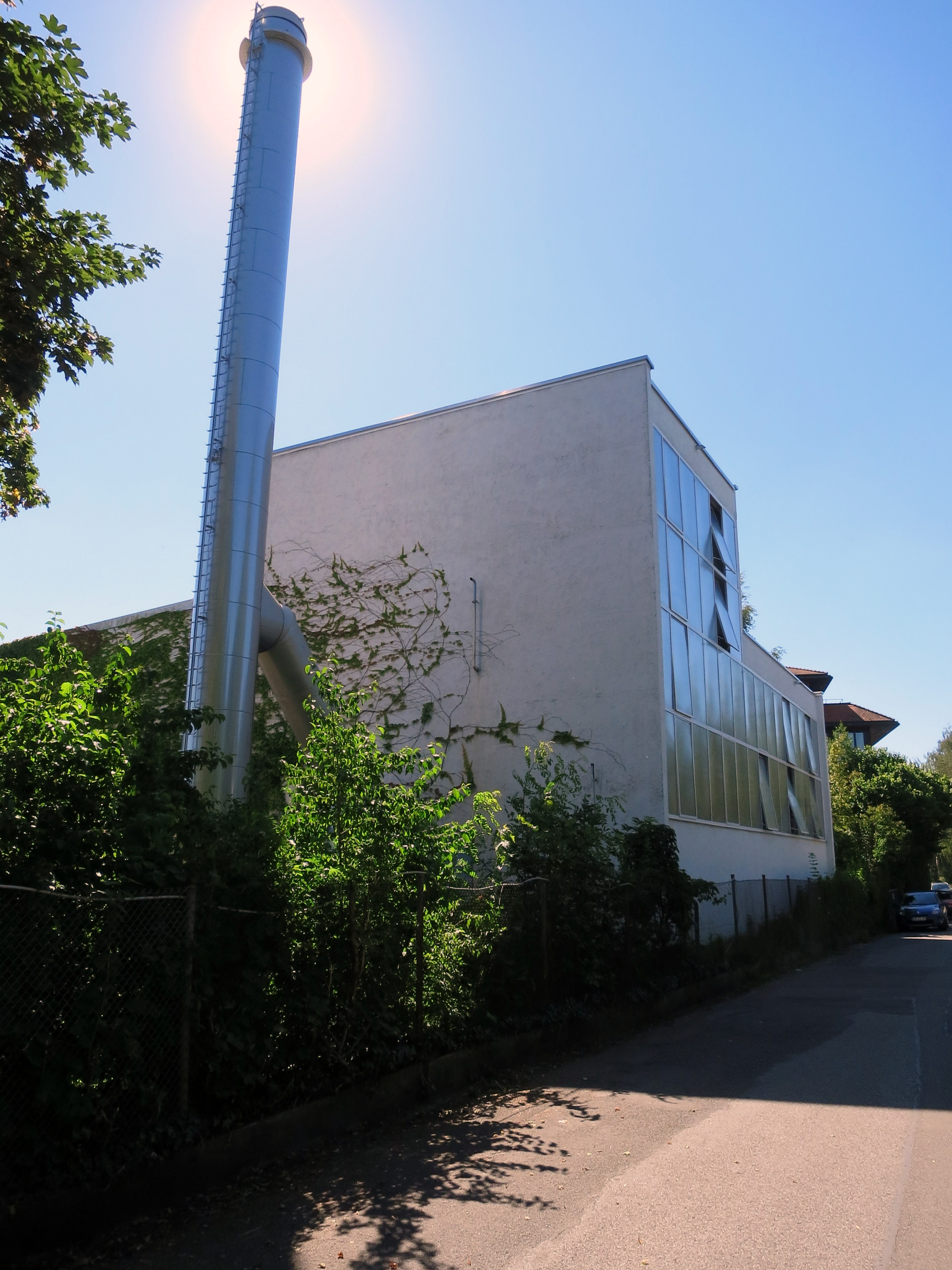
Central power building

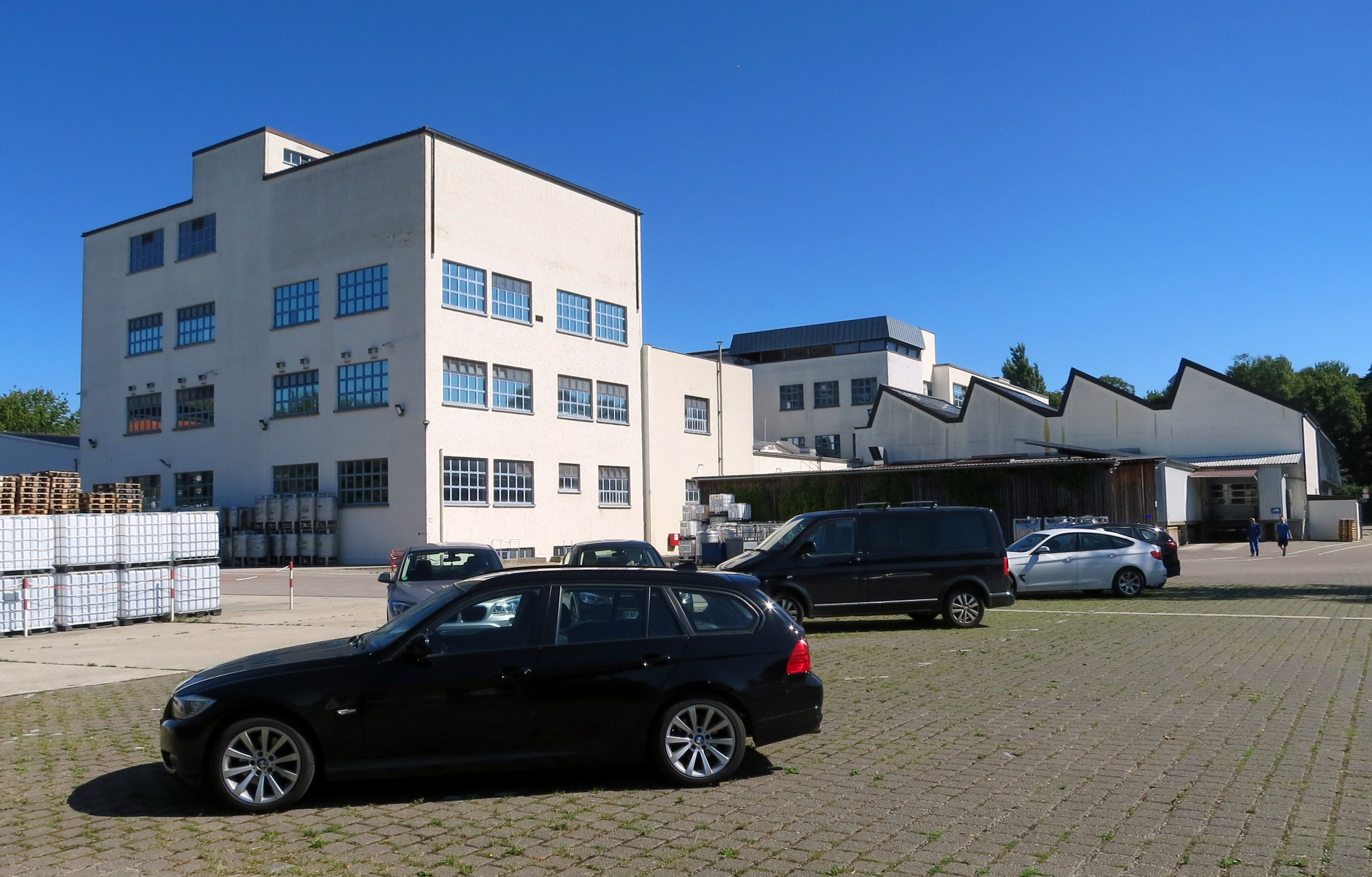
Detailed view of the production site

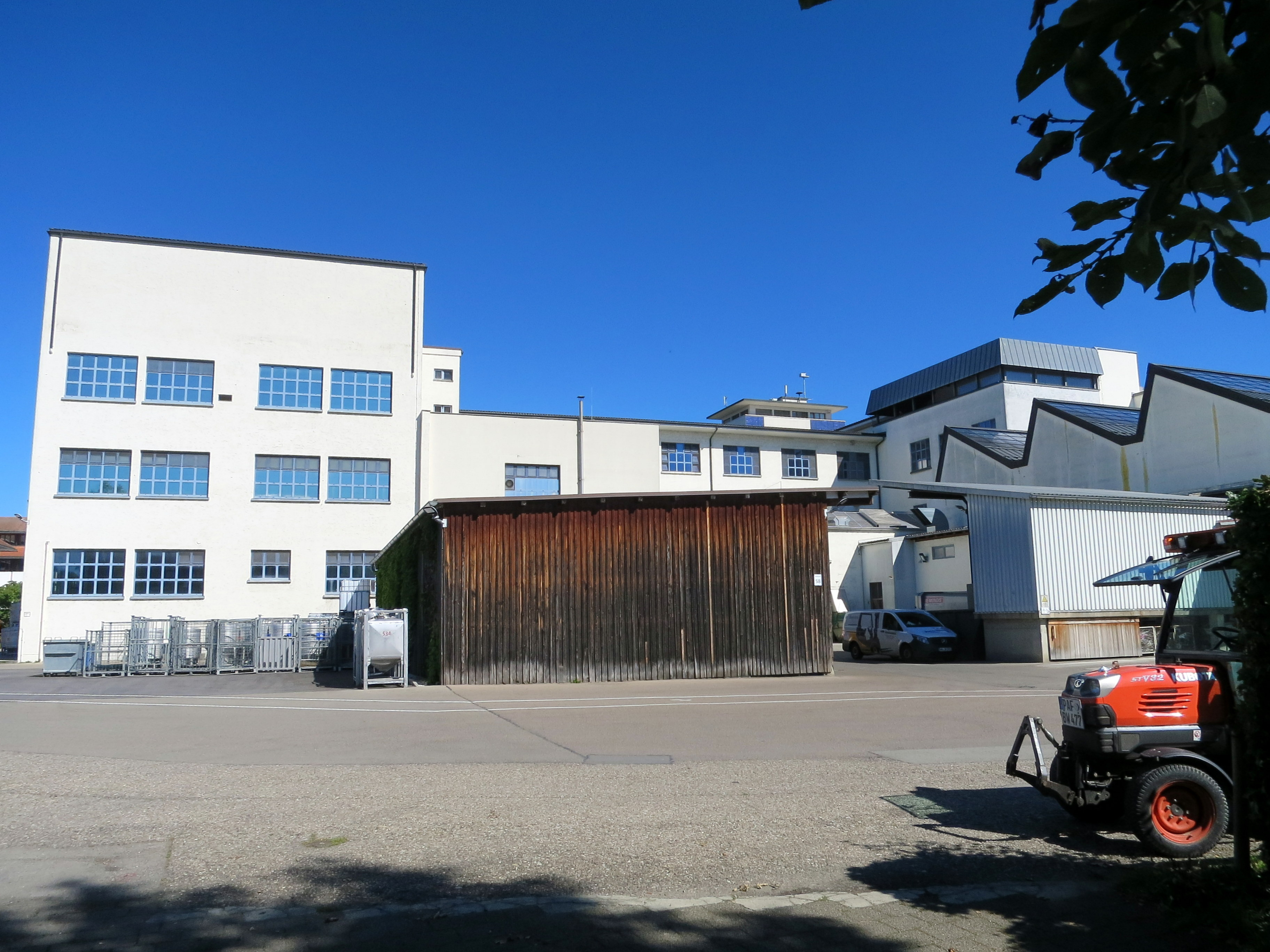
Further view of the site

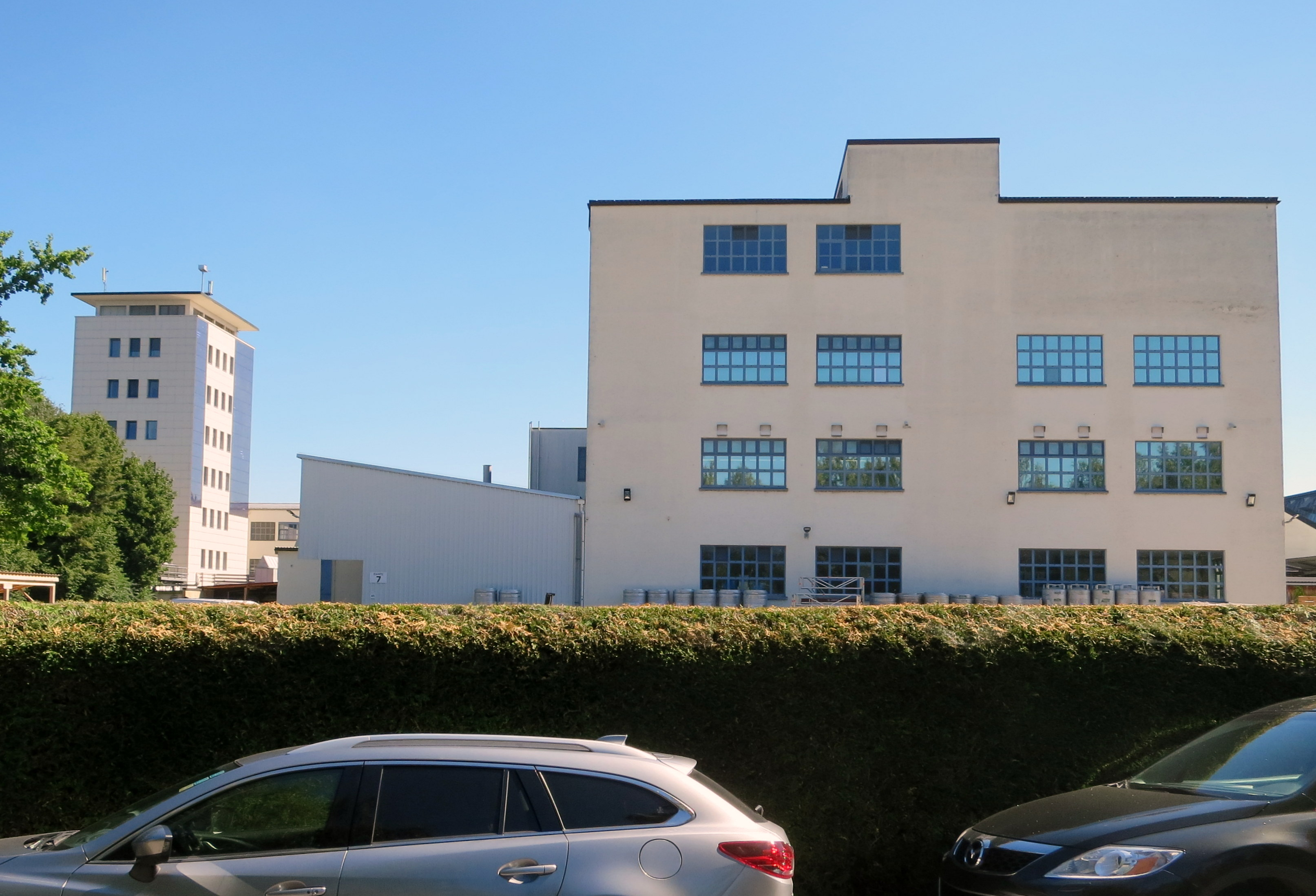
View from the south

== Criticism ==
In June 2012, the company received the "Golden Cream Puff", a negative award for the "boldest advertising lie of 2012" for its instant fruit teas made from sugar granules. Hipp advertised its instant fruit teas to small children from the age of 12 months. However, the granules of the tea contained 94 to 96% sugar, which means that a fruit tea mixed according to specifications contained around two grams of sugar per 100 milliliters. Foodwatch claims this contradicts Hipp's claim to offer "child-friendly" and "healthy" products. Nutrition experts recommend, that children should not be given any sweetened beverages, but drink water instead.

In November 2012, Hipp said it took these teas off the market and since the end of 2012 simple tea bags with no added sugar have been on the market as a substitute product. In August 2013, the consumer organization Foodwatch complained that Hipp continued to sell similar products under the Bebivita brand – a full Hipp subsidiary.

In October 2013, a sample of the ZDF consumer magazine "WISO" showed that genetically modified vegetables were processed in Hipp's organic baby food. This was found in almost a quarter of the Hipp samples that were examined. Hipp announced that it would investigate the results of the investigation and intensify the product analyses.

In February 2022, Hipp was accused of greenwashing in the weekly newspaper Die Zeit because the company did not describe itself as climate-neutral but even as climate-positive. However, this is done through climate compensation through the purchase of CO_{2} certificates, which exceed 10% of the company's CO_{2} emissions.

Despite the Russian invasion of Ukraine in 2022, HiPP has paused future investments in Russia but continues its existing operations there. While not halting business entirely, the company is refraining from further development or marketing initiatives in the region.

== Awards ==
In 2002, the company received the "World Prize for Sustainability" Energy Globe Award and in 2003/2004 the "German Environmental Reporting Award".

The latest awards are:

- On 16 October 2015, the 5th International Economic Forum took place in Baden-Baden.
- There, the IWF honored Claus Hipp with the Lifetime Achievement Award. The eulogy was held by Christian Schmidt, Federal Minister of Food and Agriculture.
- On 12 June 2015, Wirtschaftswoche named Hipp the most sustainable company. After 2011, 2012 and 2013, Hipp was also voted Germany's most sustainable company in 2015.
