= Walter Intemann =

Austrian politician (1944–2023)

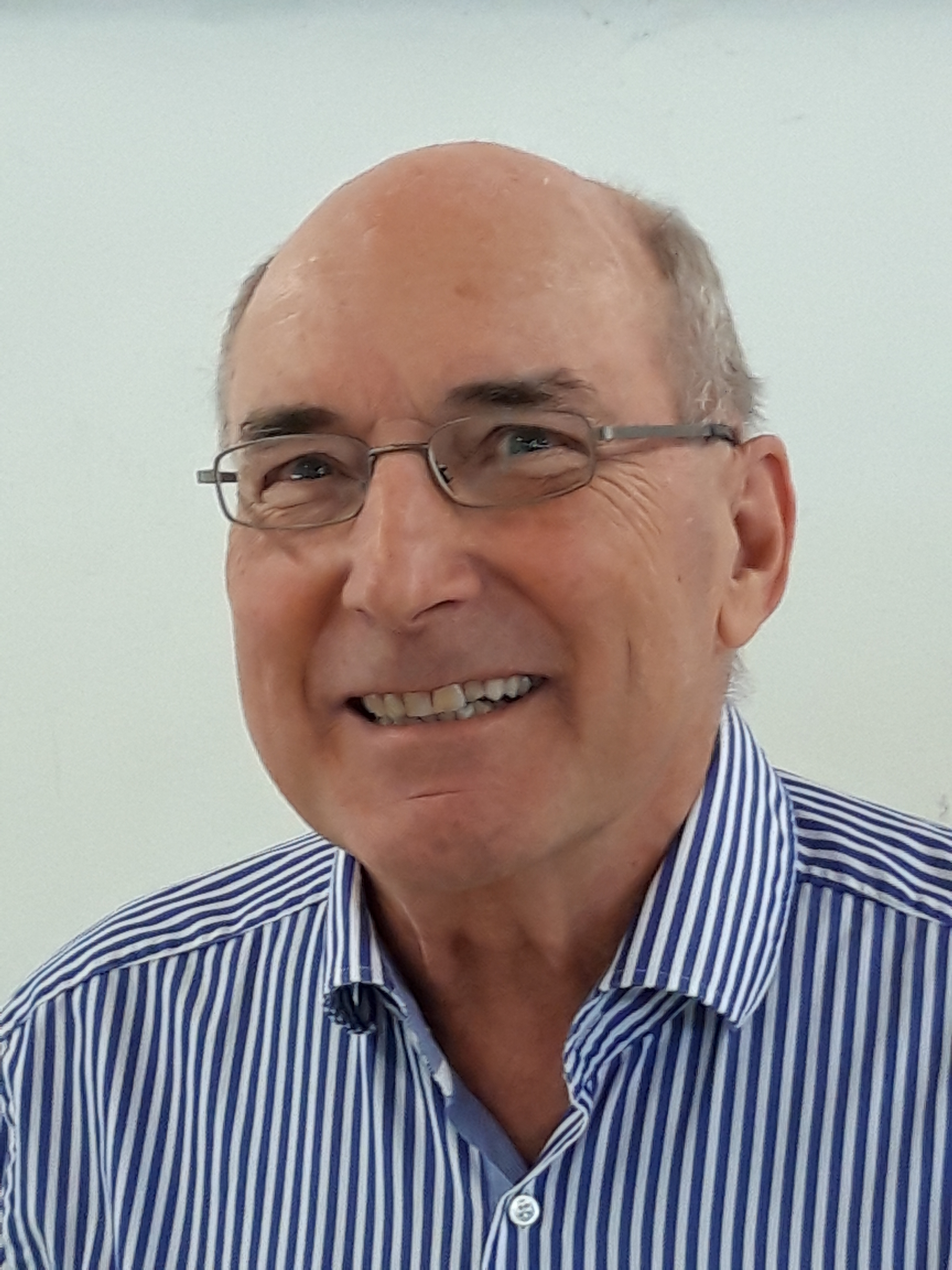
- Intemann in 2020

Member of the Landtag of Vorarlberg
- In office 20 November 1979 – 23 October 1989

Personal details
- Born: 11 December 1944 St. Gallen, Switzerland
- Died: 7 January 2023 (aged 78) Dornbirn, Austria
- Party: ÖVP
- Education: Vienna University of Economics and Business
- Occupation: Businessman

Walter Intemann (11 December 1944 – 7 January 2023) was a Swiss-born Austrian businessman and politician. A member of the Austrian People's Party, he served in the Landtag of Vorarlberg from 1979 to 1989.

Intemann died in Dornbirn on 7 January 2023, at the age of 78.
