= Helena Adler =

Austrian writer (1983–2024)

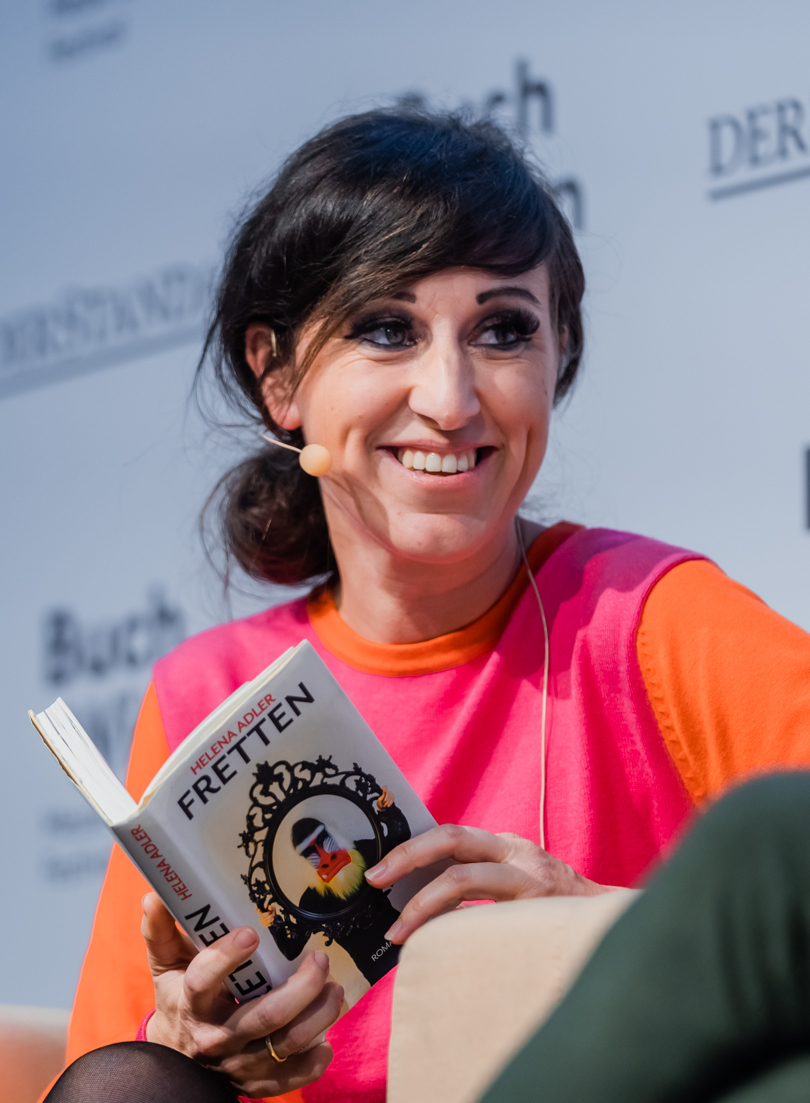
- Adler at Buch Wien (2022)
- Born: Stephanie Helene Prähauser; 16 May 1983; Oberndorf bei Salzburg, Austria
- Died: 5 January 2024 (aged 40); Salzburg, Austria
- Occupations: Author, visual artist
- Writing career
- Language: German

Helena Este Adler (16 May 1983 – 5 January 2024) was an Austrian writer and visual artist.

== Biography ==
Adler was born Stephanie Helena Prähauser in Oberndorf bei Salzburg in 1983 and grew up on a farm in Anthering. She began studying German and studied psychology and philosophy at the University of Salzburg as well as painting at the Salzburg Mozarteum. In order not to be confused with the writer and artist Teresa Präauer, she chose Helena Adler as her professional name, using her middle name as part of the pseudonym.

Adler lived with her husband, visual artist Thomas E. Stadler, and their son in a neighboring community of Anthering. She died in Salzburg on the night of January 5, 2024, at the age of 40, after being diagnosed with a brain tumor in June 2023. She was buried in Oberndorf bei Salzburg. To commemorate this, the Literaturhaus Salzburg launched the Helena Adler Prize.

== Works ==
Adler published her debut novel Hertz 52 with Arovell Verlag in 2018. For the submission text Infantennovelle. Family portrait with Watschenbaum and Wolpertinger, she received the State of Salzburg's annual scholarship for literature worth 10,000 euros in 2018. In 2020, her second novel, Die Infantin trägt den Scheitel links. (The Infanta Wears the Part on the Left), was published by Jung und Jung. The book reached fifth place on the ORF best list in April 2020; Adler opened the O-Töne literature festival in 2020 with a reading from the book. In August 2020, the novel made it onto the longlist for the German Book Prize. Further texts appeared in anthologies and literary magazines. Her third novel Fretten came to number 10 in September 2022 and number one in the ORF best list in October 2022.

Together with Monika Pichler-Kranich, Adler founded the literary workshop Literaturlobbyland (LiLoLa). She was a member of the Salzburg authors' group. As an artist, she was involved in various exhibitions and art campaigns, including at the Terra Hominibus association in Vienna in 2015 and at Divided Cities in 2016. Pushing the boundaries in Görz and in 2018 at the Modern Museum in Mauerkirchen in Upper Austria and at the Art off-space in the Narrenkastl in Frohnleiten near Graz.

Adler was invited to the Ingeborg Bachmann Competition in 2023 by Klaus Kastberger. A week before the reading competition, she withdrew from participation for health reasons. For the Tiroler Volksschauspiele in Telfs under director Gregor Bloéb, she wrote the segment Inertia for the work 7 Deadly Sins, which was interpreted by Gerti Drassl and Bernhard Bettermann at the premiere in July 2023.

In June 2024, three texts from her estate were published posthumously in the volume Miserere. Unter die Erde was broadcast on Radio Salzburg in September 2022, Ein guter Lapp in Unterjoch and Miserere Melancholia were written with a view to possible participation in the Bachmann Competition, with Adler choosing Miserere Melancholia for Klagenfurt. The text was based on her contribution to the 7 Deadly Sins project of the Tiroler Volksschauspiele. Miserere reached number one on the ORF best list in July and August 2024.

== Bibliography ==
- Hertz 52. Arovell, Vienna/Gosau 2018, ISBN 978-3-903189-14-0.
- Die Infantin trägt den Scheitel links. Jung und Jung, Vienna/Salzburg 2020, ISBN 978-3-99027-242-8.
- Fretten. Jung und Jung, Salzburg 2022, ISBN 978-3-99027-271-8.
- Miserere: Drei Texte, Jung und Jung, Salzburg 2024, ISBN 978-3-99027-407-1 (posthumous publication)
