= Weerberg =

- Municipality
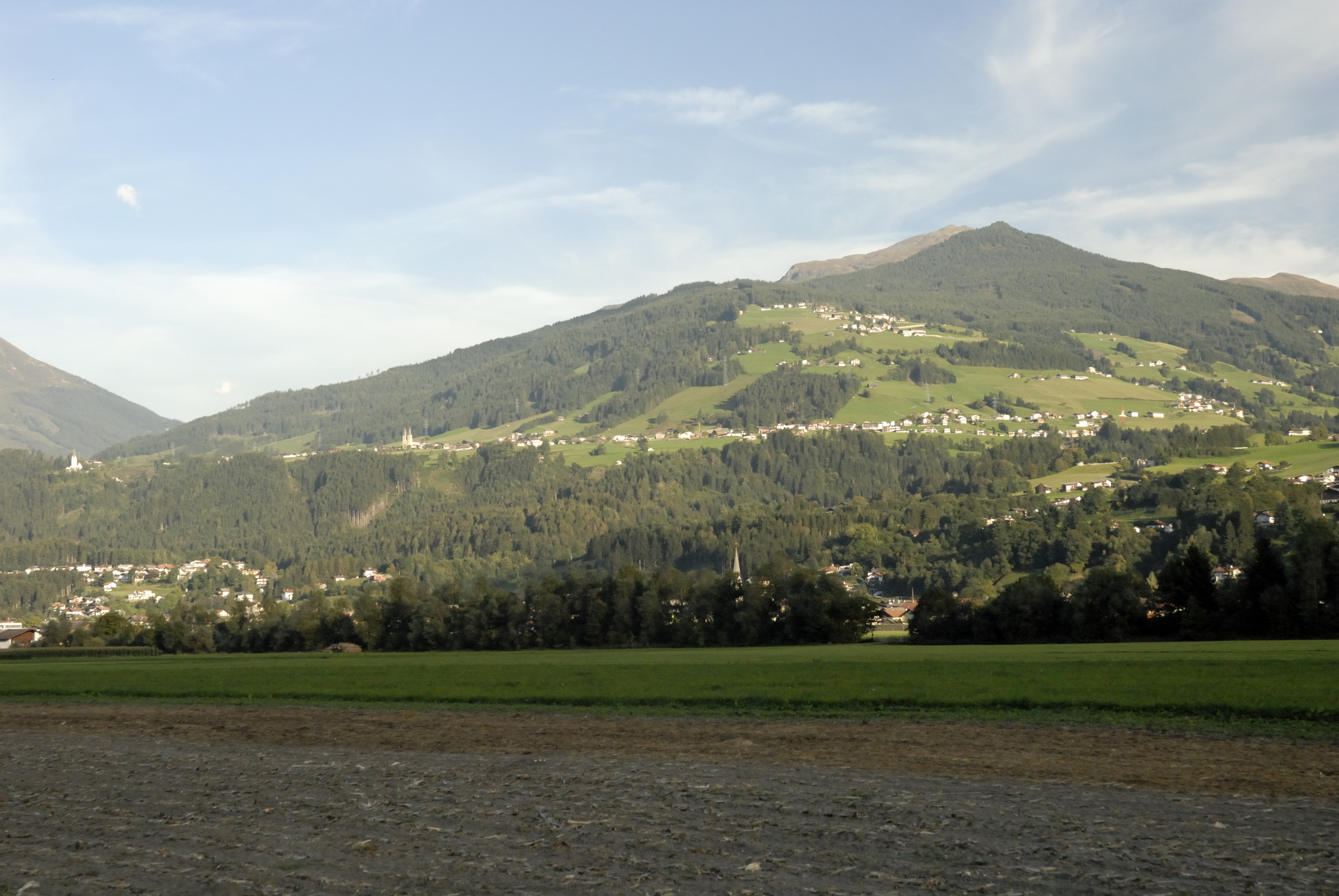
- Weerberg on the mountain slope

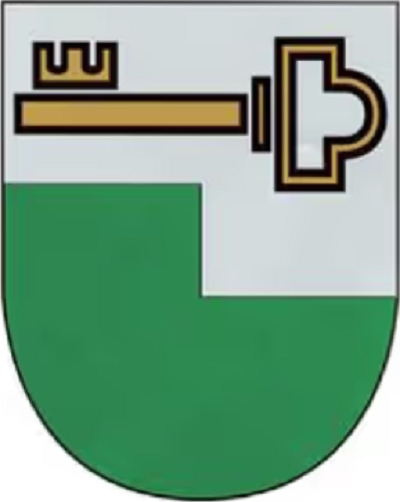
- Coat of arms

- Location within Austria
- Coordinates: 47°17′54″N 11°39′57″E
- Country: Austria
- State: Tyrol
- District: Schwaz

Government
  - Mayor: Ferdinand Angerer

Area
  - Total: 55.42 km^{2} (21.40 sq mi)
- Elevation: 882 m (2,894 ft)

Population (2018-01-01)
  - Total: 2,482
  - Density: 44.79/km^{2} (116.0/sq mi)
- Time zone: UTC+1 (CET)
  - Summer (DST): UTC+2 (CEST)
- Postal code: 6133
- Area code: 05224
- Vehicle registration: SZ
- Website: www.weerberg.at

Weerberg is a municipality in the Schwaz district in the Austrian state of Tyrol.

== Geography ==
Important peaks in the parish territory are the 2,762 m high Rastkogel and the 2,506 m high Gilfert, both in the Tux Alps.
