= Wolfgang Gerstl =

Austrian politician (born 1961)

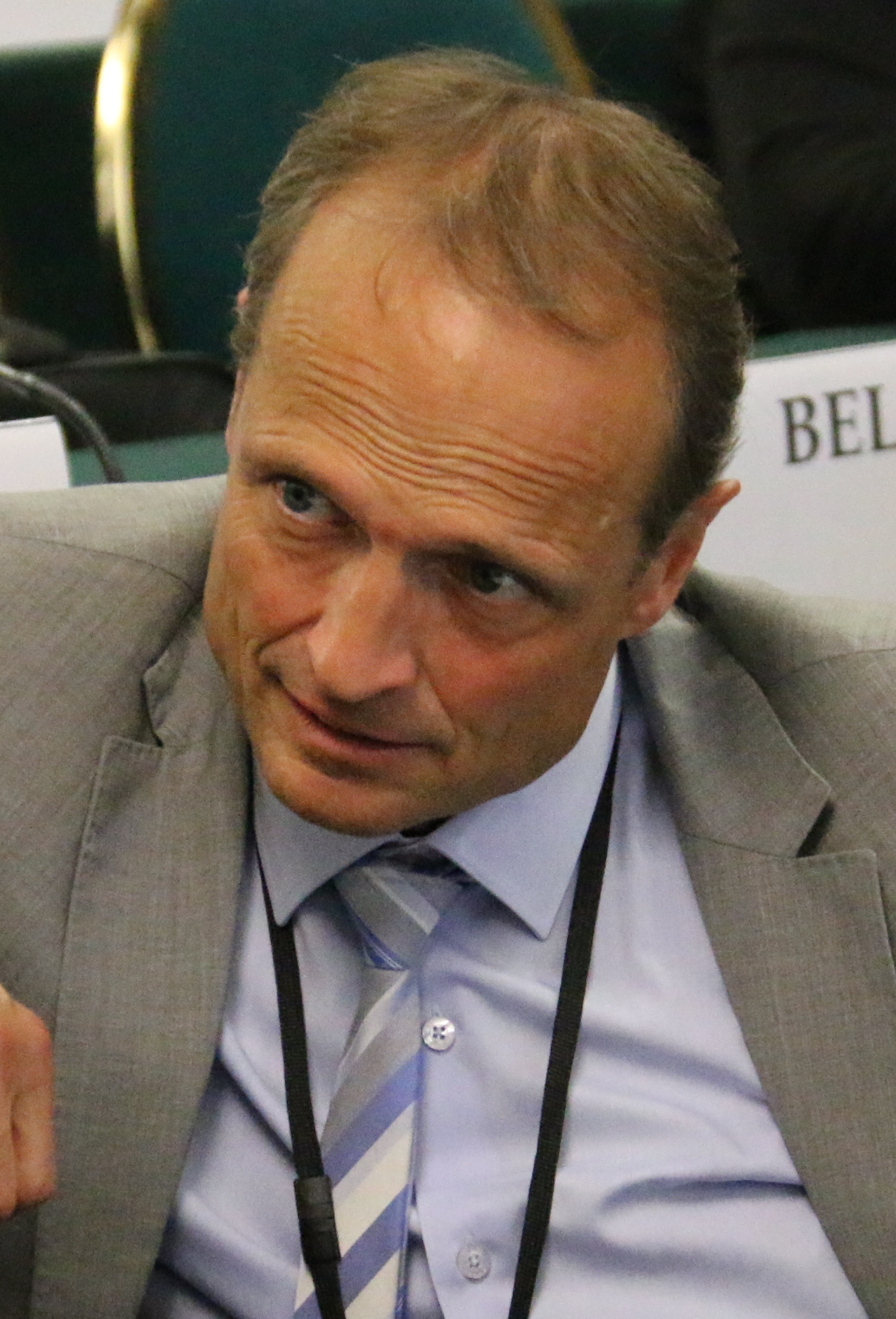
- Gerstl in 2016

Member of the National Council
- Incumbent
- Assumed office 9 September 2011
- Preceded by: Wolfgang Schüssel
- Constituency: Vienna South West (2011–2013, 2017–present); Federal list (2013–2017)

Personal details
- Born: 14 October 1961 (age 64)
- Party: People's Party

Wolfgang Gerstl (born 14 October 1961) is an Austrian politician of the People's Party serving as a member of the National Council since 2011. He was a member of the Municipal Council and Landtag of Vienna from 2001 to 2010, and a member of the government of Vienna from 2010 to 2011.
