= Norbert Cyffer =

German-Austrian linguist (1943–2025)

- Born: 16 May 1943; Dortmund, Gau Westphalia-South, Germany
- Died: 12 March 2025 (aged 81)
- Occupation: Linguist

Academic background
- Education: University of Hamburg

Academic work
- Institutions: University of Vienna
- Main interests: Saharan languages

Norbert Cyffer (16 May 1943 – 12 March 2025) was a German-Austrian linguist and professor emeritus of African Studies at the University of Vienna. Cyffer was primarily interested in African languages and linguistics, particularly the Saharan languages of the Sahelian region. His research areas include morphology, syntax, language contact, sociolinguistics, typology, and applied linguistics.

== Background ==
Cyffer studied from 1965 to 1973 at the University of Hamburg, where he focused on African studies, general linguistics, and ethnology. Over the course of two years, he performed two field trips in northeastern Nigeria to collect data for his dissertation. In 1974, he obtained his doctorate upon completing his dissertation on Kanuri syntax.

Cyffer died on 12 March 2025, at the age of 81.

== Career ==
From 1974 to 1981, Cyffer taught and performed research at Ahmadu Bello University (Zaria and Kano) and the University of Maiduguri in Nigeria.

After teaching and research in Nigeria, he worked as a professor at the University of Mainz in 1982. In 1994, he was appointed full professor at the University of Vienna, where he worked until retiring in 2011. Cyffer has been President of the Austrian-Nigerian Friendship Society since 2012.

Cyffer was a visiting professor at the University of Nice, University of Prague, and University of Maiduguri over several decades.

== Honours and awards ==
Norbert Cyffer was given the traditional title of Shettima in 2004 by the Shehu of Borno (the traditional leader of the Emirate of Borno). In 2013, he received the Educational Cooperation Award from the government of Nigeria.

== Publications ==
- Cyffer, Norbert & John P. Hutchison. 1979. The Standard Kanuri Orthography. Lagos: Thomas Nelson.
- Cyffer, Norbert. 1989. Sprachwandel und idiolektale Variation im Kanuri. Günter Holtus and Edgar Radtke (eds.), Sprachlicher Substandard II. Tübingen: Max Niemeyer. 114–130.
- Cyffer, Norbert & John P. Hutchison. 1990. Dictionary of the Kanuri Language. dorDrecht: Foris Publications.
- Cyffer, Norbert. 1991. From basic linguistic research to the implementation of a mother-tongue in the Nigerian educational system: The Kanuri example. Norbert Cyffer et al., Language Standardization in Africa. Hamurg: Helmut Buske. 135–144.
- Cyffer, Norbert. 1991. We learn Kanuri. Köln: Rüdiger Köppe.
- Cyffer, Norbert. 1994. English–Kanuri Dictionary. Köln: Rüdiger Köppe.
- Cyffer, Norbert. 1996. Die saharanischen Sprachen: Innere und äußere Beziehungen. Axel Fleisch and Dirk Otten (eds.), Sprachkulturelle und historische Forschungen in Afrika. Köln: Rüdiger Köppe. 103 – 118.
- Cyffer, Norbert & Thomas Geider (eds.). 1997. Advances in Kanuri Scholarship. Köln: Rüdiger Köppe.
- Cyffer, Norbert. 1998. A Sketch of Kanuri. Köln: Rüdiger Köppe.
- Cyffer, Norbert. 2009. Negation patterns in Kanuri. Norbert Cyffer, Erwin Ebermann and Georg Ziegelmeyer (eds.), Negation Patterns in West African Languages and Beyond. Amsterdam: John Benjamins. 71–92.
- Cyffer, Norbert. 2010. GA, RO and CO. Strategies of complementation and subordination in Kanuri. Georg Ziegelmeyer and Norbert Cyffer (eds.), Aspects of Co- and Subordination. Case Studies from African, Slavonic and Turkic Languages. Köln: Rüdiger Köppe. 189–211.
- Cyffer, Norbert. 2011. Gibt es primitive Sprachen – oder ist Deutsch auch primitiv? Thomas Stolz et al. (eds.), Kolonialzeitliche Sprachforschung. Die Beschreibung afrikanischer und ozeanischer Sprachen zur Zeit deutscher Kolonialherrschaft. Berlin: Akademie Verlag. 55–74.
- Cyffer, Norbert. 2017. Plurality and pluractionality in Kanuri. STUF – Sprachtypologie und Universalienforschung. 70.1: 93–116.
- Cyffer, Norbert. 2020. Saharan. Rainer Vossen & Gerrit J. Dimmendaal (eds.), The Oxford Handbook of African Languages. Oxford: Oxford University Press. 383–391.
