= Johann Seitinger =

Austrian politician (1961–2024)

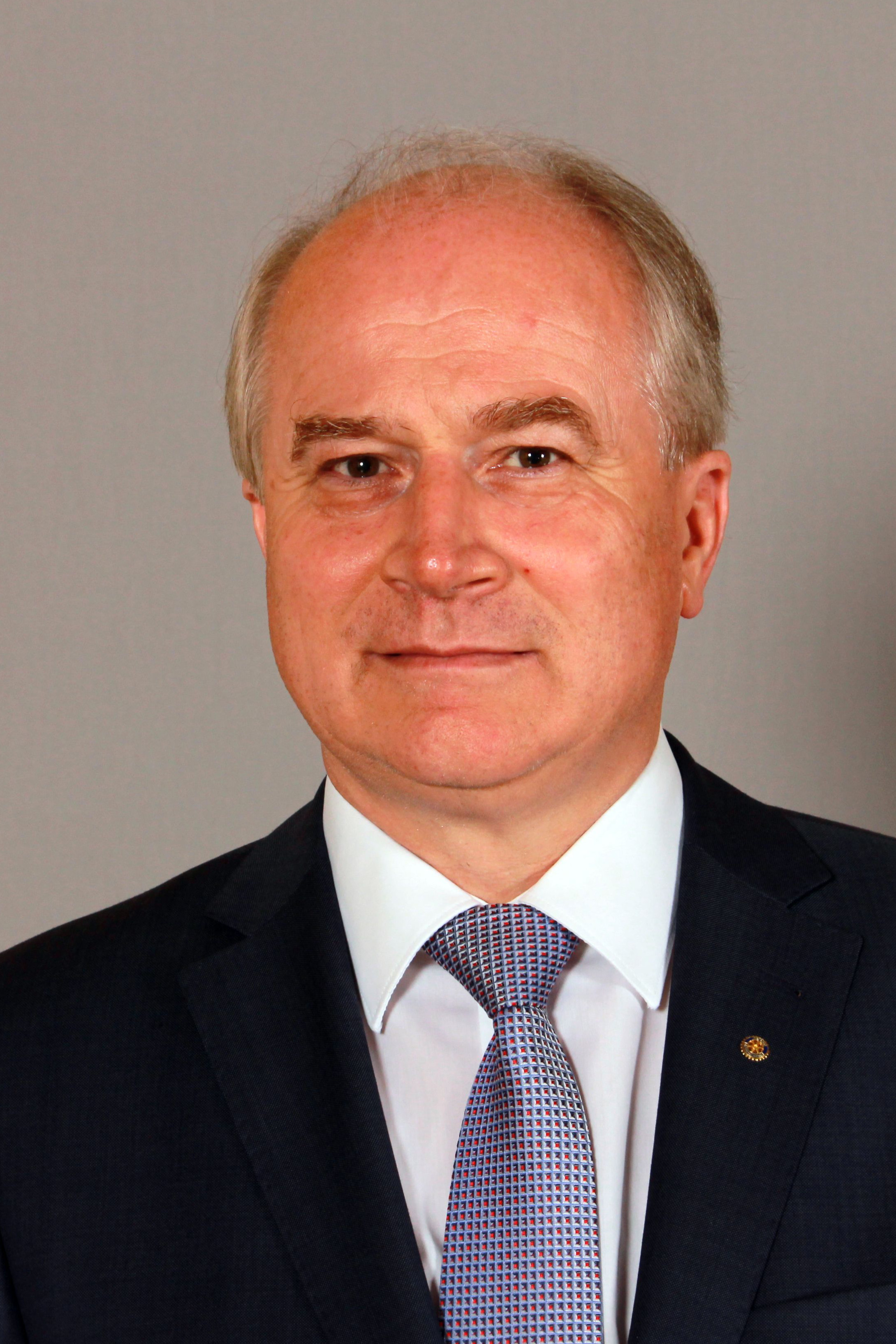
Johann Seitinger, regional councilor in the Styrian state government

Johann Seitinger (25 January 1961 – 14 July 2024) was an Austrian politician and member of the Austrian People's Party (ÖVP). Seitinger served in the Landtag Styria, the elected legislature for the Austrian state of Styria, from 2003 until his October 2023 resignation due to serious health issues. During his tenure in state government, he oversaw the Styria departments of agriculture and forestry, housing, water and resource management. Prior to entering state politics, Seitinger also served as the mayor of his hometown of Frauenberg from 1999 until 2003.

Seitinger announced his resignation from the Landtag Styria on 5 October 2023, citing declining health. He left office on 16 October 2023 after 20 years in the Landtag. He died on 14 July 2024, at the age of 63.
