= Johannes Hübner =

Austrian politician (1956–2025)

Member of the National Council
- In office 28 October 2008 – 15 October 2017
- Constituency: 9E Vienna South West

Personal details
- Born: 7 October 1956 Vienna, Austria
- Died: 2 February 2025 (aged 68)
- Party: Freedom Party of Austria

Johannes Hübner (7 October 1956 – 2 February 2025) was an Austrian politician who was a Member of the Federal Parliament for Vienna South-West for the Freedom Party of Austria (FPÖ) 2008–2017. He previously sat in parliament for Vienna District 4 (1986–1997). He was the party's spokesman on Foreign Affairs until October 2017.

== Life and career ==
Hübner was born in Vienna on 7 October 1956. He graduated from Vienna University with a Doctorate in Law in 1979 and took articles 1980–86, when he commenced working as a lawyer. He was the legal advisor to the FPÖ.

On 3 February 2023, leaked emails revealed that a Kremlin-linked lobbying group offered payments to several European politicians to promote pro-Russia policies. According to these emails, Johannes Hübner was in this group of these politicians, and he would get €20,000 for holding a speech in the Austrian Parliament against sanctions on Russia. He would have received an extra €15,000 if the vote had been successful.

A Motion for a resolution was registered on the official parliament website on 7 June 2016, to cancel sanctions imposed on Russia due to "considerable "harm to the Austrian economy" (the same thesis as in leaked emails).

Hübner died on 2 February 2025, at the age of 68.

== Sources ==
- Johannes Hübner at IMDb
- Parliamentary biography
