= Karl-Werner Rüsch =

Austrian politician (1937–2024)

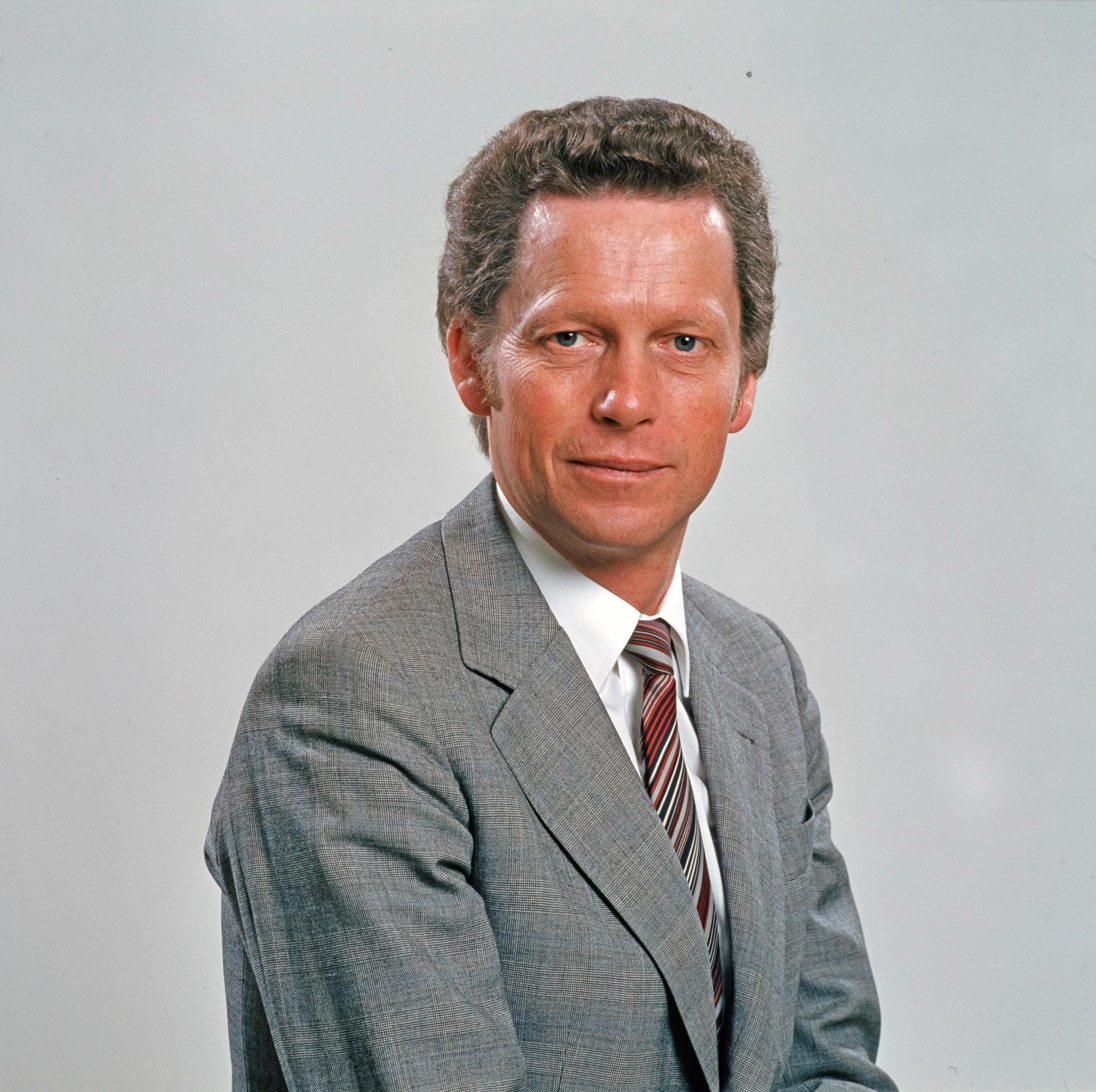
- Rüsch in 1981

Member of the Landtag of Vorarlberg
- In office 17 November 1976 – 20 April 1984

Personal details
- Born: 29 September 1937 Tehran, Iran
- Died: 12 February 2024 (aged 86) Dornbirn, Vorarlberg, Austria
- Party: FPÖ
- Education: Technical University of Munich
- Occupation: Civil engineer

Karl-Werner Rüsch (29 September 1937 – 12 February 2024) was an Austrian civil engineer and politician. A member of the Freedom Party, he served in the Landtag of Vorarlberg from 1976 to 1984.

Rüsch died in Dornbirn on 12 February 2024, at the age of 86.
