= List of Austrian European Film Award winners and nominees =

This is a list of Austrian European Film Award winners and nominees. This list details the performances of Austrian actors, actresses, and films that have either been submitted or nominated for, or have won, a European Film Award.

== Awards and nominations ==
Year (Ceremony)	Award	Recipient	Result	Note	Ref.
1988 (1st)	Best Actor	Klaus Maria Brandauer for Hanussen	Nominated		
1993 (6th)	Best Film	Benny's Video	Nominated		
1999 (12th)	Best Film	Sunshine	Nominated	Canadian-Hungarian-Austrian-German co-production	
1999 (12th)	Best Documentary	Pripyat	Nominated		
2000 (13th)	European Discovery of the Year	Northern Skirts	Nominated	Austrian-German-Swiss co-production	
2001 (14th)	Best Film	The Piano Teacher	Nominated	French-Austrian co-production	
2001 (14th)	People's Choice Award for Best European Film	The Piano Teacher	Nominated	French-Austrian co-production	
2001 (14th)	European Discovery of the Year	Dog Days	Nominated		
2001 (14th)	European Discovery of the Year	Lovely Rita	Nominated	Austrian-German co-production	
2001 (14th)	Best Short Film	Copy Shop	Nominated		
2001 (14th)	Best Screenwriter	Michael Haneke for The Piano Teacher	Nominated		
2003 (16th)	European Discovery of the Year	Fuse	Nominated	Bosnian-Austrian-Turkish-French co-production	
2004 (17th)	Best Documentary	Darwin's Nightmare	Won	Austrian-French-Belgian co-production	
2005 (18th)	Best Film	Caché	Won	French-Austrian-German-Italian co-production	
2005 (18th)	Best Documentary	Workingman's Death	Nominated	Austrian-German co-production	
2005 (18th)	Best Director	Michael Haneke for Caché	Won		
2005 (18th)	Best Editor	Michael Hudecek for Caché (along with Nadine Muse)	Won		
2005 (18th)	Best Screenwriter	Michael Haneke for Caché	Nominated		
2005 (18th)	Best Cinematographer	Christian Berger for Caché	Nominated		
2006 (19th)	Best Film	Grbavica: Esma's Secret	Nominated	Bosnian-Austrian-German-Croatian co-production	
2006 (19th)	Best Documentary	Our Daily Bread	Nominated		
2006 (19th)	Best Director	Florian Henckel von Donnersmarck for The Lives of Others	Nominated	German-Austrian director	
2007 (20th)	Best Documentary	To the Limit	Nominated	German-Austrian co-production	
2007 (20th)	Best European Co-Producer	Veit Heiduschka	Won		
2009 (22nd)	Best Film	The White Ribbon	Won	German-Austrian-French-Italian co-production	
2009 (22nd)	Best Documentary	Cooking History	Nominated	Slovak-Austrian-Czech co-production	
2009 (22nd)	Best Documentary	Pianomania	Nominated	German-Austrian co-production	
2009 (22nd)	Best Documentary	Defamation	Nominated	Danish-Austrian-Israeli-American co-production	
2009 (22nd)	Best Director	Michael Haneke for The White Ribbon	Won		
2009 (22nd)	Best Screenwriter	Michael Haneke for The White Ribbon	Won		
2009 (22nd)	Best Cinematographer	Christian Berger for The White Ribbon	Nominated		
2010 (23rd)	Best Short Film	Talleres Clandestinos	Nominated	Austrian-Argentine co-production	
2011 (24th)	European Discovery of the Year	Breathing	Nominated		
2011 (24th)	European Discovery of the Year	Michael	Nominated		
2011 (24th)	Best Short Film	Hypercrisis	Nominated		
2012 (25th)	Best Film	Amour	Won	French-Austrian-German co-production	
2012 (25th)	Best Short Film	In the Open	Nominated		
2012 (25th)	Best Director	Michael Haneke for Amour	Won		
2012 (25th)	Best Actress	Margarethe Tiesel for Paradise: Love	Nominated		
2012 (25th)	Best Screenwriter	Michael Haneke for Amour	Nominated		
2014 (27th)	Best Documentary	Master of the Universe	Won	German-Austrian co-production	
2014 (27th)	Best Documentary	We Come as Friends	Nominated	Austrian-French co-production	
2015 (28th)	European Discovery of the Year	Goodnight Mommy	Nominated		
2015 (28th)	Best Cinematographer	Martin Gschlacht for Goodnight Mommy	Won		
2016 (29th)	Best Film	Toni Erdmann	Won	German-Austrian co-production	
2016 (29th)	European University Film Award	Toni Erdmann	Nominated	German-Austrian co-production	
2016 (29th)	Best Actor	Peter Simonischek for Toni Erdmann	Won		
2017 (30th)	European Discovery of the Year	The Eremites	Nominated	German-Austrian co-production	
2017 (30th)	Best Short Film	Wannabe	Nominated		
2017 (30th)	Best Actor	Josef Hader for Stefan Zweig: Farewell to Europe	Nominated		
2017 (30th)	People's Choice Award for Best European Film	Stefan Zweig: Farewell to Europe	Won	German-Austrian-French co-production	
2018 (31st)	European University Film Award	Styx	Nominated	German-Austrian co-production	

- Nominations – 52
- Wins – 15

=== Special awards ===
Year (Ceremony)	Award	Recipient	Result	Note	Ref.
2015 (28th)	Achievement in World Cinema Award	Christoph Waltz	Won		

== See also ==
- List of Austrian submissions for the Academy Award for Best International Feature Film
