= Herbert Madejski =

Austrian politician (1945–2025)

Member of the National Council
- In office 1 July 2013 – 28 October 2013

Personal details
- Born: 7 October 1945; Vienna, Austria
- Died: 3 February 2025 (aged 79); Vienna, Austria
- Political party: FPÖ
- Education: Vienna University of Economics and Business
- Occupation: Economist

Herbert Madejski (7 October 1945 – 3 February 2025) was an Austrian politician. A member of the Freedom Party, he served in the National Council from July to October 2013.

Madejski died on 3 February 2025, at the age of 79.
