= Salzburg =

Capital of the state of Salzburg, Austria

- Statutory city
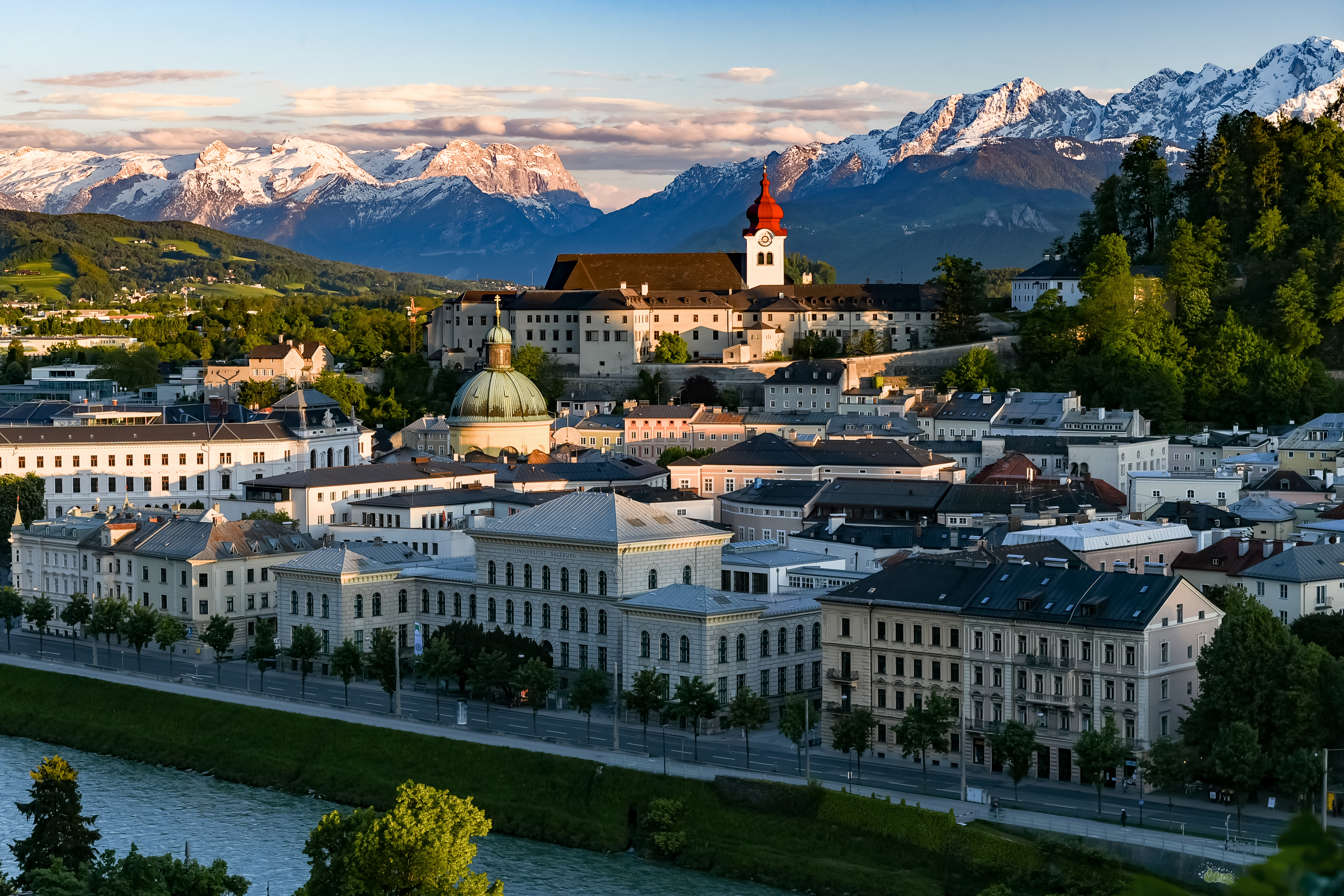
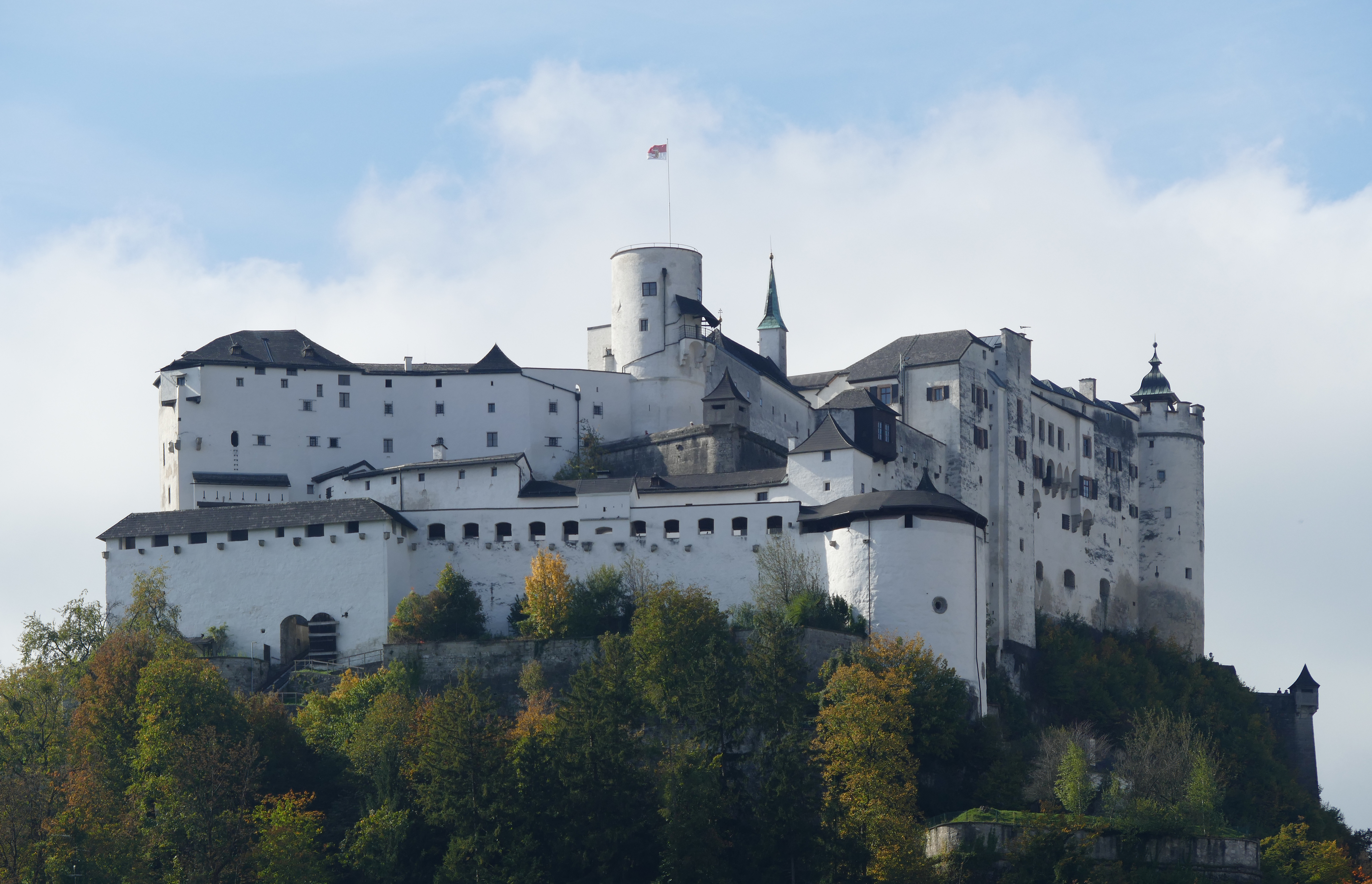
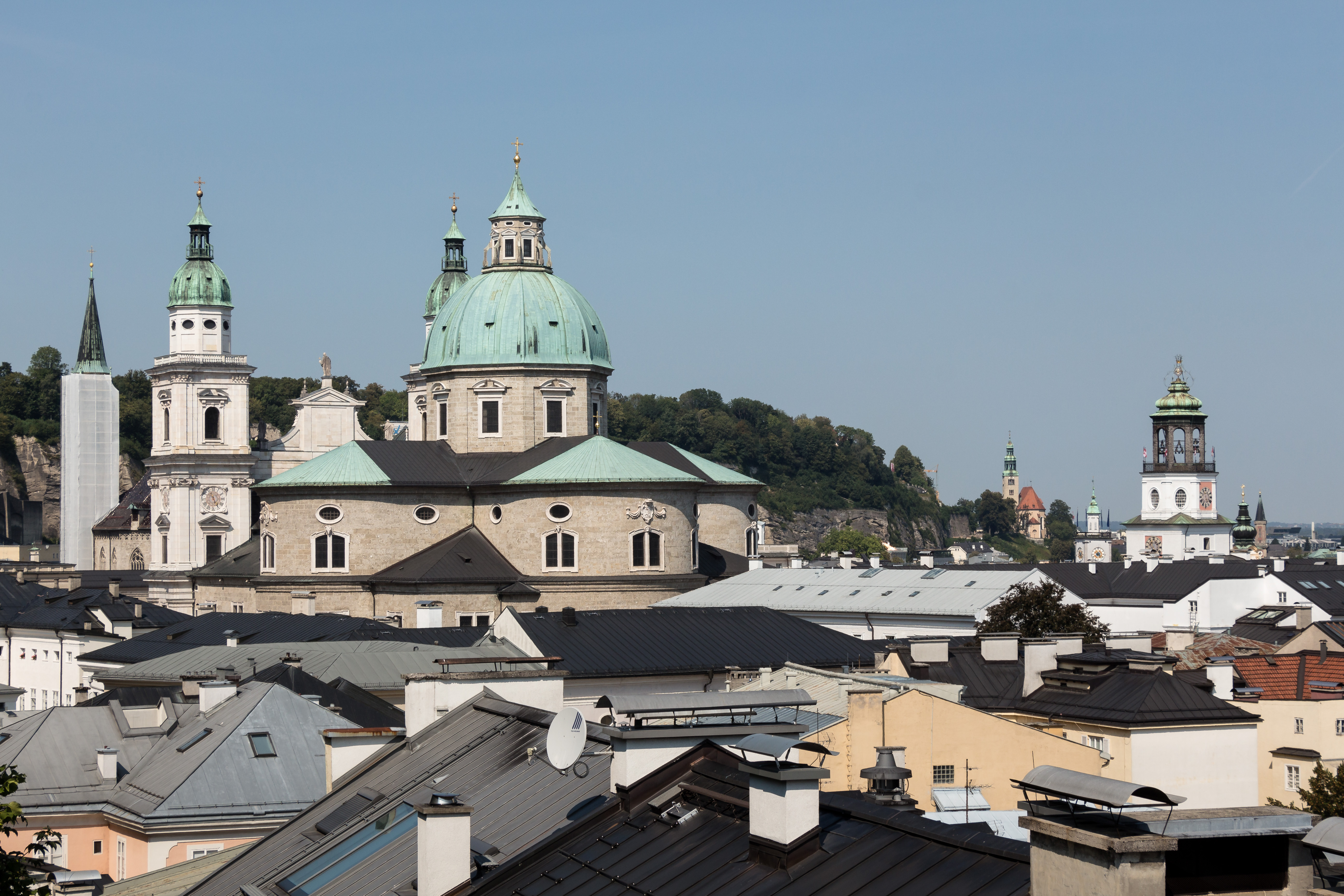
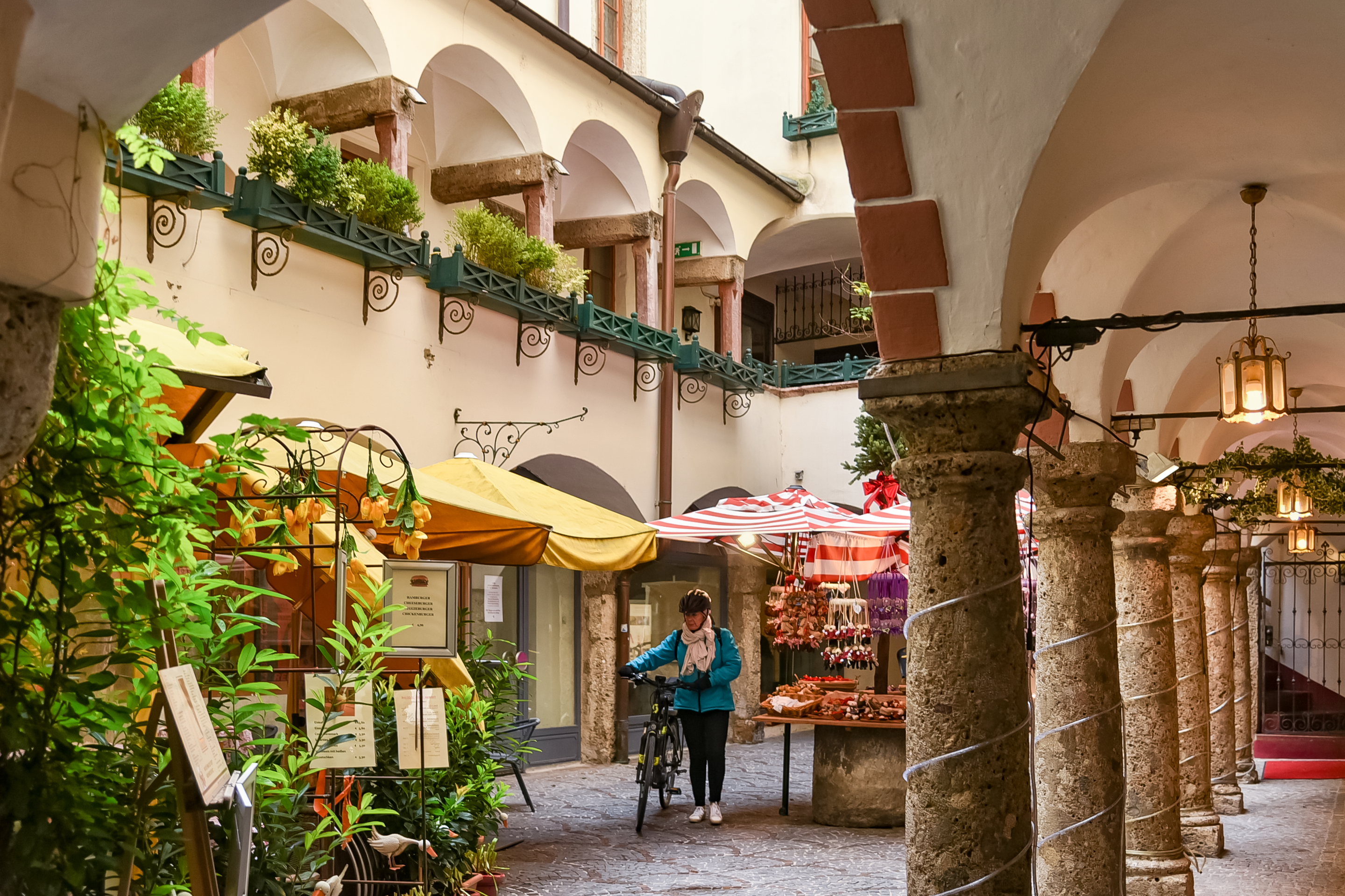
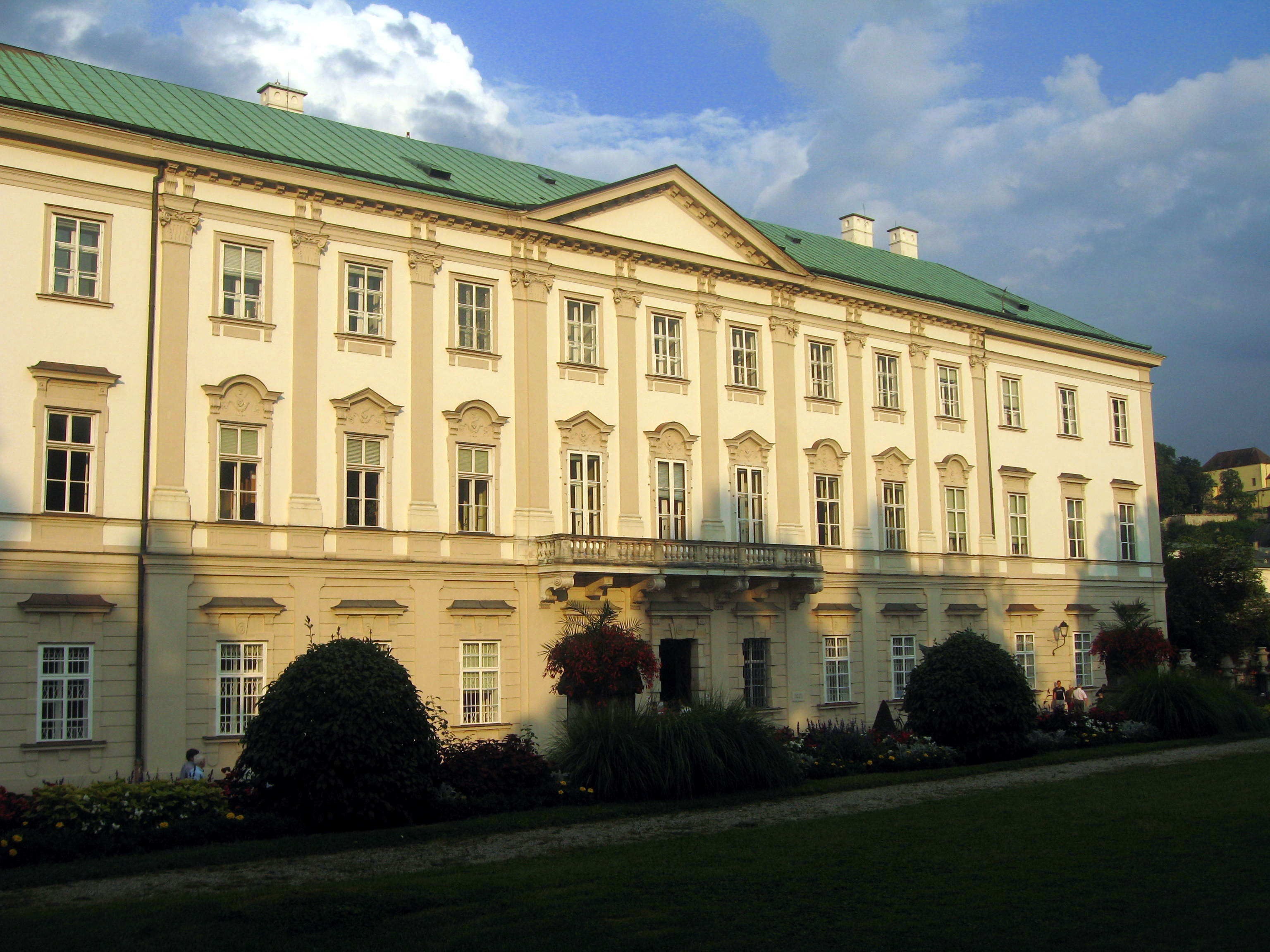
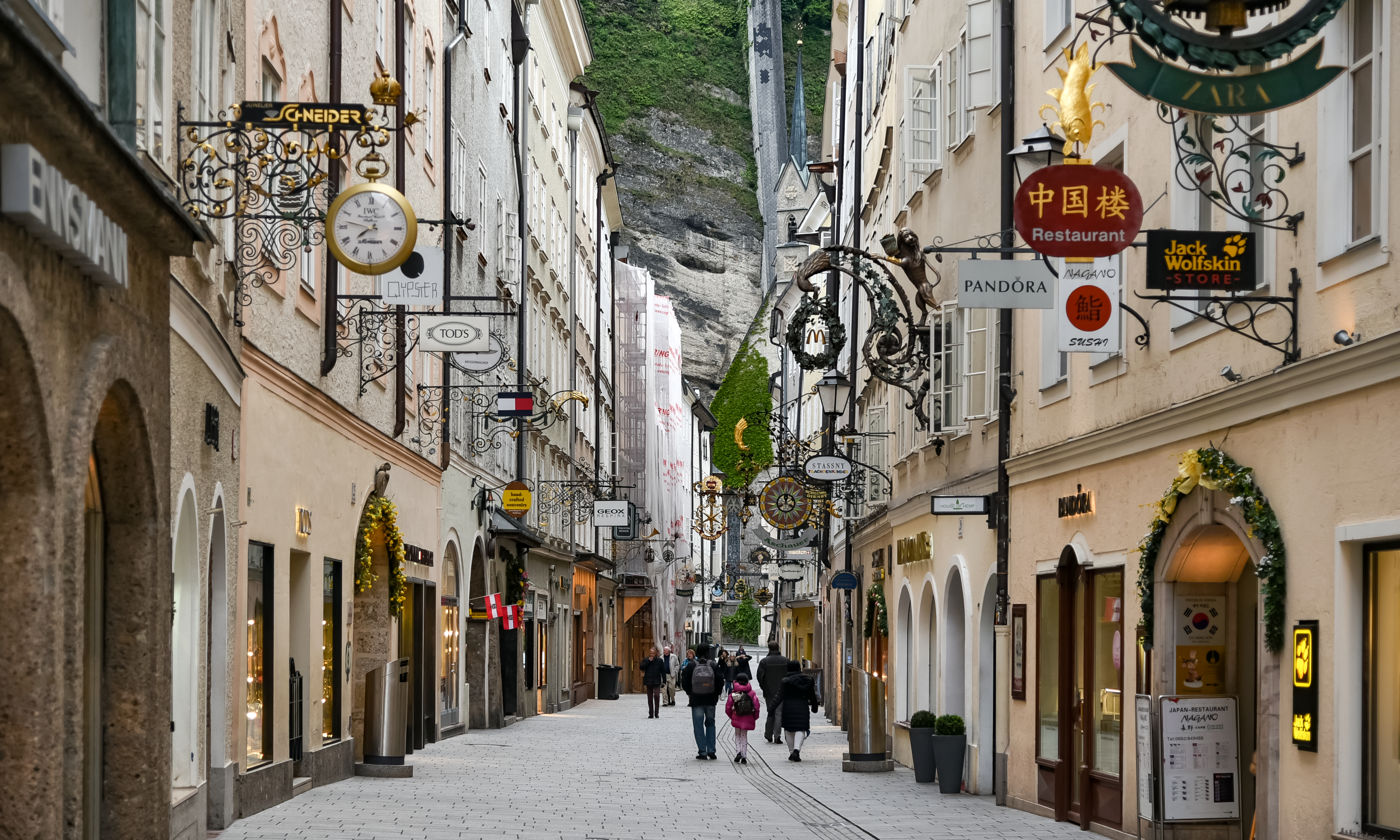
- View of University of Salzburg in front of the Salzach, with Nonnberg Abbey in the background Hohensalzburg Fortress Salzburg Cathedral Roittner-Durchhaus Mirabell Palace Getreidegasse

- Flag Coat of arms

- Location within Austria Salzburg (Austria)
- Coordinates: 47°48′00″N 13°02′42″E
- Country: Austria
- State: Salzburg
- District: Statutory city

Government
  - Mayor: Bernhard Auinger (SPÖ)

Area
  - Statutory city: 65.65 km^{2} (25.35 sq mi)
- Elevation: 424 m (1,391 ft)

Population (2026)
  - Statutory city: 157,834
  - Rank: 4th in Austria
  - Density: 2,404/km^{2} (6,227/sq mi)
  - Urban: 234,928
- Demonym(s): English: Salzburger or Salzburgian; German: Salzburger (m.), Salzburgerin (f.)
- Time zone: UTC+1 (CET)
  - Summer (DST): UTC+2 (CEST)
- Postal code: 5020
- Area code: 0662
- Vehicle registration: S
- Website: www.stadt-salzburg.at

Historic Centre of the City of Salzburg
UNESCO World Heritage Site
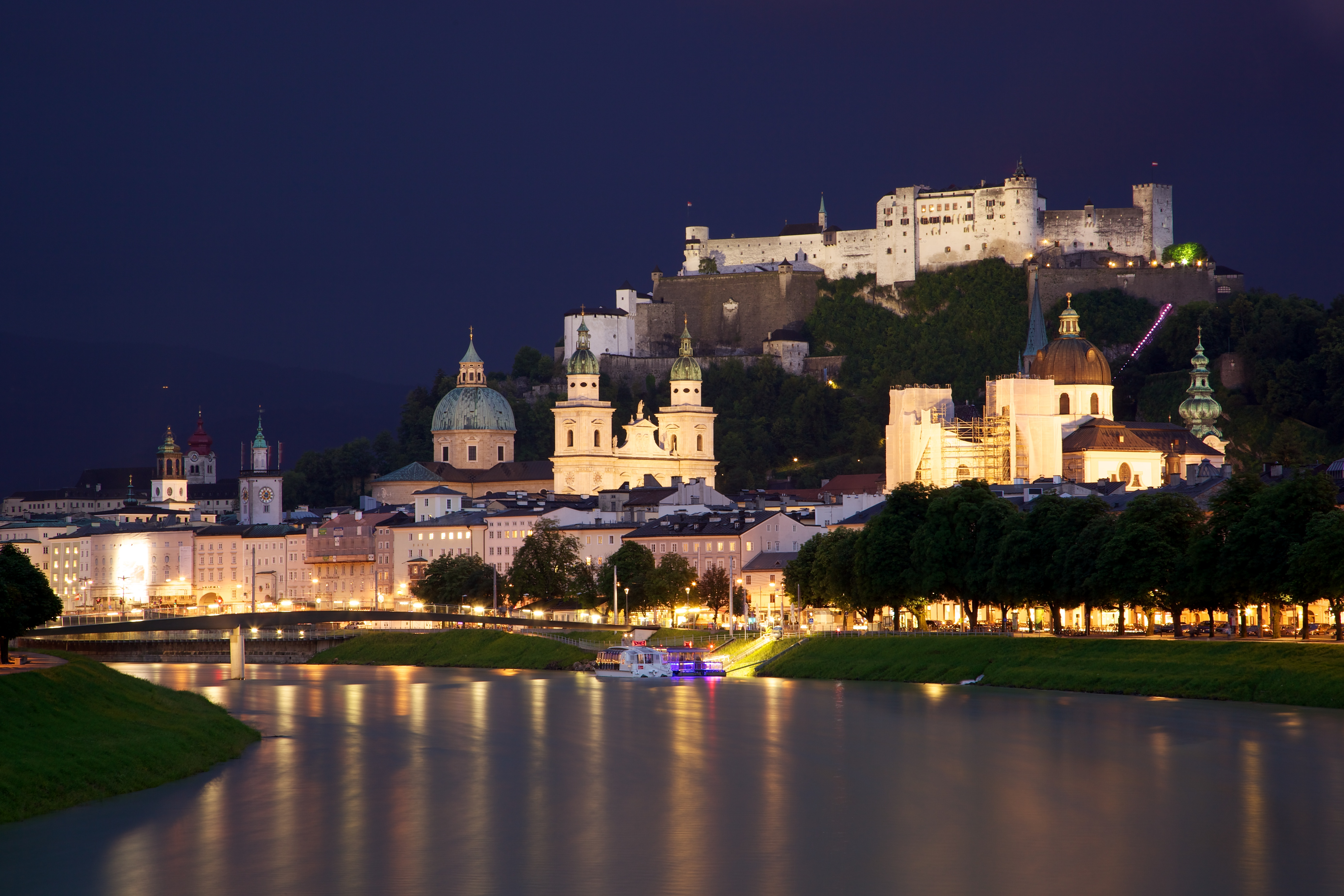
- Interactive map of Historic Centre of the City of Salzburg
- Criteria: Cultural: ii, iv, vi
- Reference: 784
- Inscription: 1996 (20th Session)
- Area: 236 ha (580 acres)
- Buffer zone: 467 ha (1,150 acres)

Salzburg (Note: English: /ˈsɔːltsbɜːrɡ/ SAWLTS-burg, also UK: /ˈsælts-/ SALTS-, US: /ˈsɔːlz-, ˈsɑːlz-, ˈsælz-/ SAWLZ-, SA(H)LZ-; Austrian German: [ˈsaltsbʊrɡ], elsewhere [ˈzaltsbʊʁk].) is the fourth-largest city in Austria. In 2026, its population was 157,994. The city lies on the Salzach River, near the border with Germany and at the foot of the Alps mountains.

The town occupies the site of the Roman settlement of Iuvavum. Founded as an episcopal see in 696, it became a seat of the archbishop in 798. Its main sources of income were salt extraction, trade and gold mining. The fortress of Hohensalzburg, one of the largest medieval fortresses in Europe, dates from the 11th century. In the 17th century, Salzburg became a centre of the Counter-Reformation, with monasteries and numerous Baroque churches built. Salzburg has an extensive cultural and educational history, being the birthplace of Wolfgang Amadeus Mozart and being home to three universities and a large student population. Today, along with Vienna and the Tyrol, Salzburg is one of Austria's most popular tourist destinations.

Salzburg's historic centre (German: Altstadt) is renowned for its Baroque architecture and is one of the best-preserved city centres north of the Alps. The historic centre was listed as a UNESCO World Heritage Site in 1996.

== Etymology ==
The name "Salzburg" was first recorded in the late 8th century. (Note: Spelled "Salzpurch" in the earliest vita of Saint Boniface) It is composed of two parts; the first being "Salz-" (German for "salt"), and the second being "-burg" from Proto-West-Germanic: *burg "settlement, city" and not that of the New High German: Burg, lit. 'fortress'.

== History ==
=== Antiquity ===
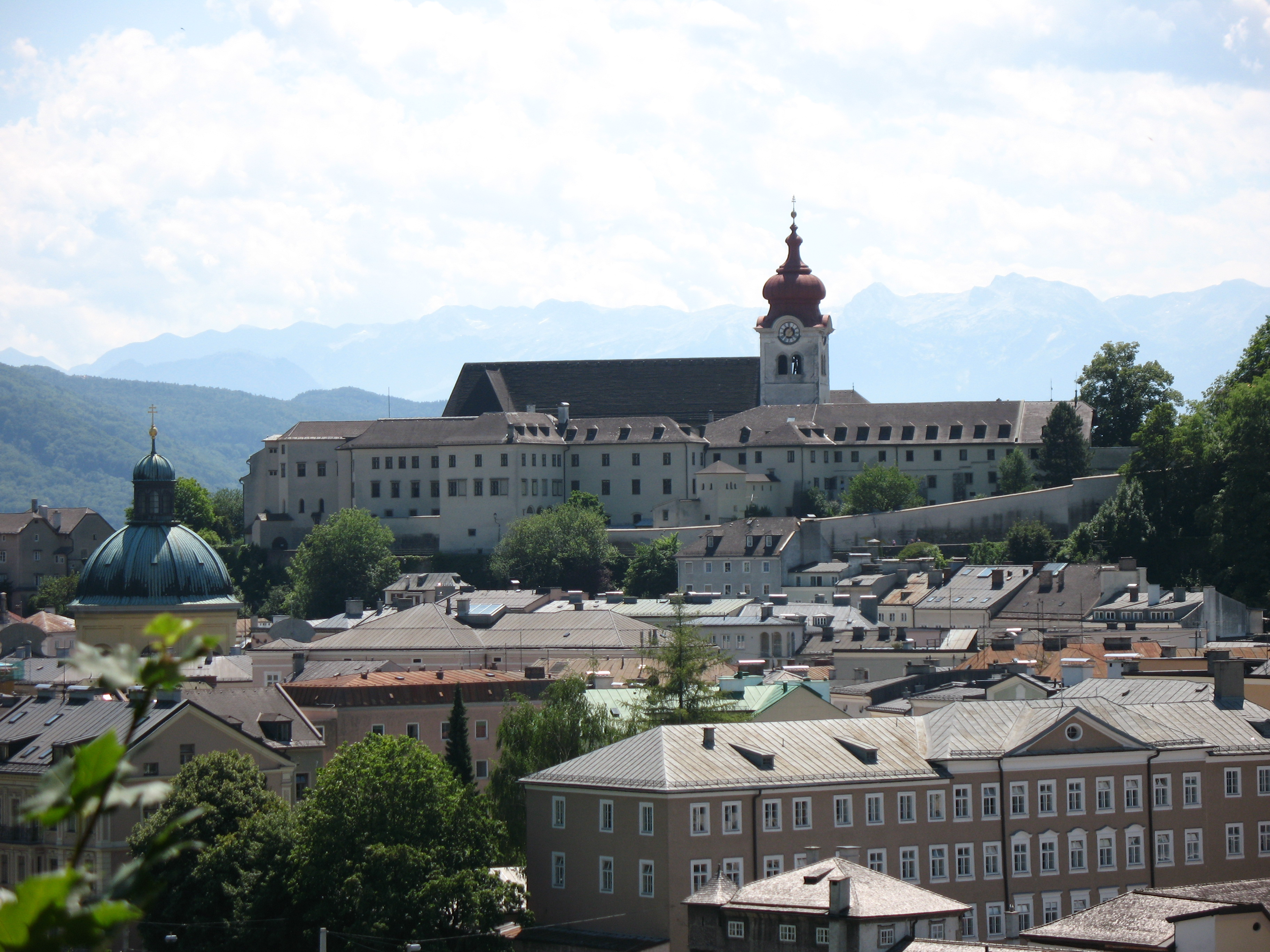
In the 8th century the Benedictine monastery of Nonnberg was founded for Erentrudis, who was later canonized.

The area of the city has been inhabited continuously since the Neolithic Age until the present. In the La Tène period, it was an administrative centre of the Celtic Taurisci in the Kingdom of Noricum.

After the Roman invasion in 15 BC, the various settlements on the Salzburg hills were abandoned, following the construction of the Roman city in the area of the old town. The recently created Municipium Claudium Iuvavum was awarded the status of a Roman municipium in 45 AD and became one of the most important cities of the now Roman province of Noricum.

=== Middle Ages ===
When the province of Noricum collapsed in 488 AD at the beginning of the migration period, part of the Romano-Celtic population remained in the country. In the 6th century, they came under the rule of the Baiuvarii. The Life of Saint Rupert credits the 8th-century saint with the city's rebirth, when around 696 AD, Bishop Rupert of Salzburg received the remains of the Roman town from Duke Theodo II of Bavaria as well as a castrum superius (upper castle) on the Nonnberg Terrace as a gift. In return, he was to evangelize the east and south-east of the country of Bavaria.

Rupert reconnoitred the river for the site of his basilica and chose Iuvavum. He ordained priests and annexed the manor of Piding. Rupert built a church at St. Peter on the site of today's cathedral and probably also founded the associated monastery and the Benedictine nunnery on Nonnberg for his relative Erentrude. Salzburg has been the seat of a diocesan bishop since 739 AD and an archbishopric since 798 AD. The first cathedral was built under Archbishop Virgil. The Franciscan Church existed since the beginning of the 9th century at the latest. The Marienkirche dates from 1139.

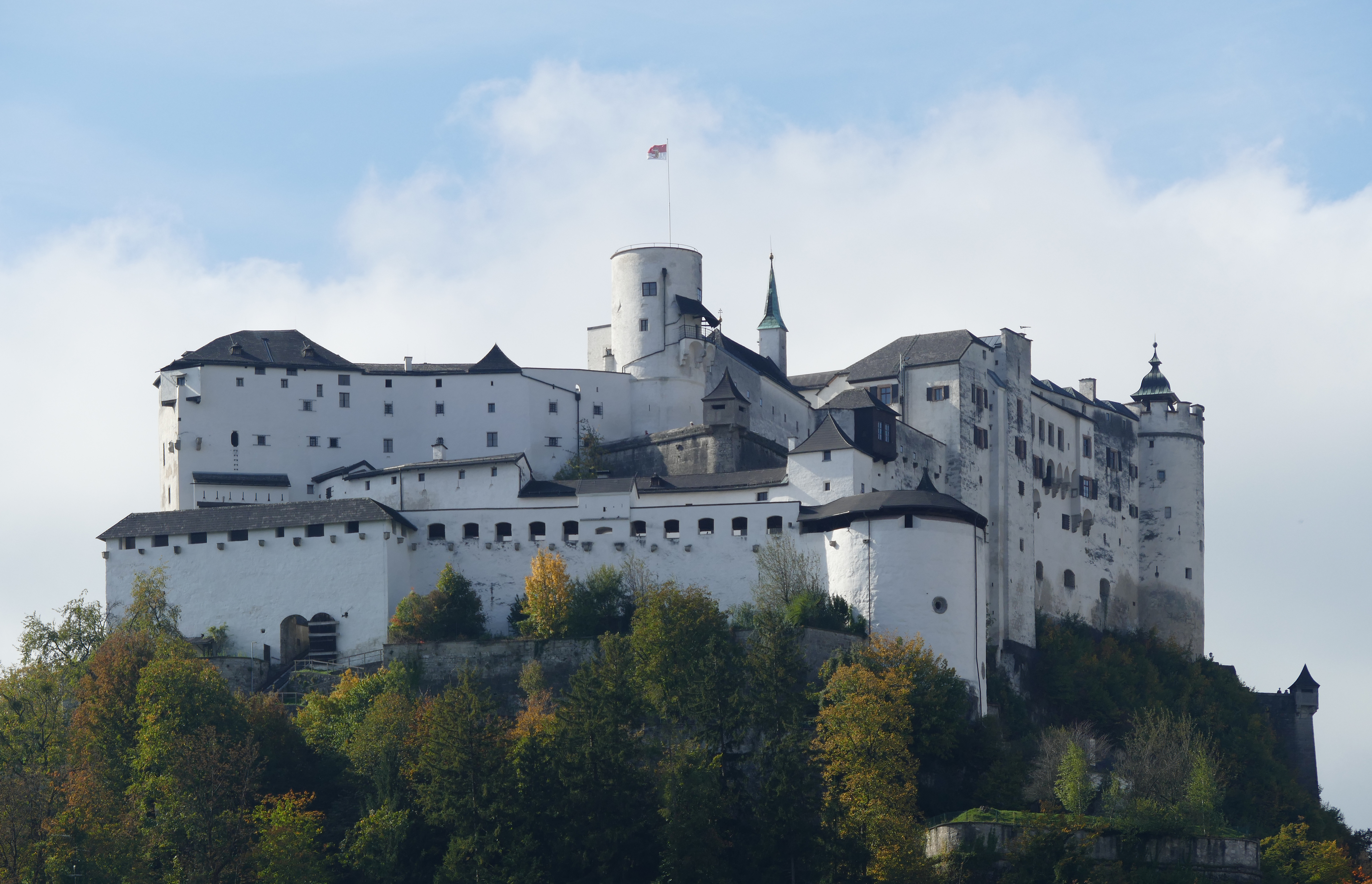
The Romanesque Palace, Hohensalzburg Fortress, with a ring wall enclosing the hilltop, built on the site of a Roman fort

The first use of the German name Salzburg can be traced back to 739 AD when the name was used in Willibald's report on the organization of the Bavarian dioceses by Saint Boniface. The name derives from the barges carrying salt on the River Salzach, which were subject to a toll in the 8th century as was customary for many communities and cities on European rivers. Hohensalzburg Fortress, the city's fortress was built on the site of a Roman fort in 1077 by Archbishop Gebhard, who made it his residence. It was greatly expanded during the following centuries. This site is not the site of the Roman castrum superius, which was located on the Nonnberg nearby.

The state of Salzburg and its counties soon gained more and more influence and power within Bavaria due to the flourishing salt mining and the wide-ranging missionary activities. In 996 Otto III, Holy Roman Emperor rented Archbishop Hartwig the market rights and minting rights (probably also the toll law). The first part of Hohensalzburg Fortress was built in 1077. A city judge was first mentioned in a document in 1120/30. On the left bank of the Salzach, an extensive spiritual district was created with the cathedral, the bishop's residence north-west of the cathedral, the cathedral monastery on its south side, St Peter's monastery, and the Frauengarten (probably after a former women's convent that was dissolved in 1583). Only during the 12th century did the civil settlement begin to spread into the Getreidegasse, the Abtsgasse (Sigmund Haffner-Gasse), and along the quay. Around 1280, the first city fortifications were created. The oldest known city law document dates from the year 1287.

=== Under the prince-bishopric's rule ===
Independence from Bavaria was secured in the late 14th century. Salzburg was the seat of the Archbishopric of Salzburg, a prince-bishopric of the Holy Roman Empire. Following the Imperial reform of 1500, Salzburg became part of the Bavarian Circle, an administrative grouping of territories introduced to improve the empire's governance, defence, and tax collection.

As the Reformation movement gained momentum, riots broke out among peasants in the areas surrounding Salzburg. The city was occupied during the German Peasants' War, and the Archbishop had to flee to the safety of the fortress. It was besieged for three months in 1525.

Eventually, tensions were quelled, and the city's independence led to an increase in wealth and prosperity, culminating in the late 16th to 18th centuries under the Prince Archbishops Wolf Dietrich von Raitenau, Markus Sittikus, and Paris Lodron. It was in the 17th century that Italian architects (and Austrians who had studied the Baroque style) rebuilt the city centre as it is today, along with many palaces.

=== Modern era ===
==== Religious conflict ====
On 31 October 1731, the 214th anniversary of the 95 Theses, Archbishop Count Leopold Anton von Firmian signed an Edict of Expulsion, the Emigrationspatent, directing all Protestant citizens to recant their non-Catholic beliefs. 21,475 citizens refused to recant their beliefs and were expelled from Salzburg. Most of them accepted an offer by King Friedrich Wilhelm I of Prussia, travelling the length and breadth of Germany to their new homes in East Prussia. The rest settled in other Protestant states in Europe and the British colonies in America.

==== Illuminism ====
In 1772–1803, under archbishop Hieronymus Graf von Colloredo, Salzburg was a centre of late Illuminism. Colloredo is known for being one of the main employers of Wolfgang Amadeus Mozart. Colloredo often had arguments with Mozart, and he dismissed him by saying, Soll er doch gehen, ich brauche ihn nicht! (He should go; I don't need him!). Mozart left Salzburg for Vienna in 1781 with his family, although his father Leopold stayed behind, as he had a close relationship with Colloredo.

=== Electorate of Salzburg ===
In 1803, the archbishopric was secularised by Emperor Napoleon; he transferred the territory to Ferdinando III of Tuscany, former Grand Duke of Tuscany, as the Electorate of Salzburg.

=== Austrian and Bavarian rule ===
In 1805, Salzburg was annexed to the Austrian Empire, along with the Berchtesgaden Provostry. In 1809, the territory of Salzburg was transferred to the Kingdom of Bavaria after Austria's defeat at Wagram. After the Congress of Vienna with the Treaty of Munich (1816), Salzburg was definitively returned to Austria, but without Rupertigau and Berchtesgaden, which remained with Bavaria. Salzburg was integrated into the Province of Salzach, and Salzburgerland was ruled from Linz.

In 1850, Salzburg's status was restored as the capital of the Duchy of Salzburg, a crownland of the Austrian Empire. The city became part of Austria-Hungary in 1866 as the capital of a crownland of the Austrian Empire. The nostalgia of the Romantic Era led to increased tourism. In 1892, a funicular was installed to facilitate tourism to Hohensalzburg Fortress.

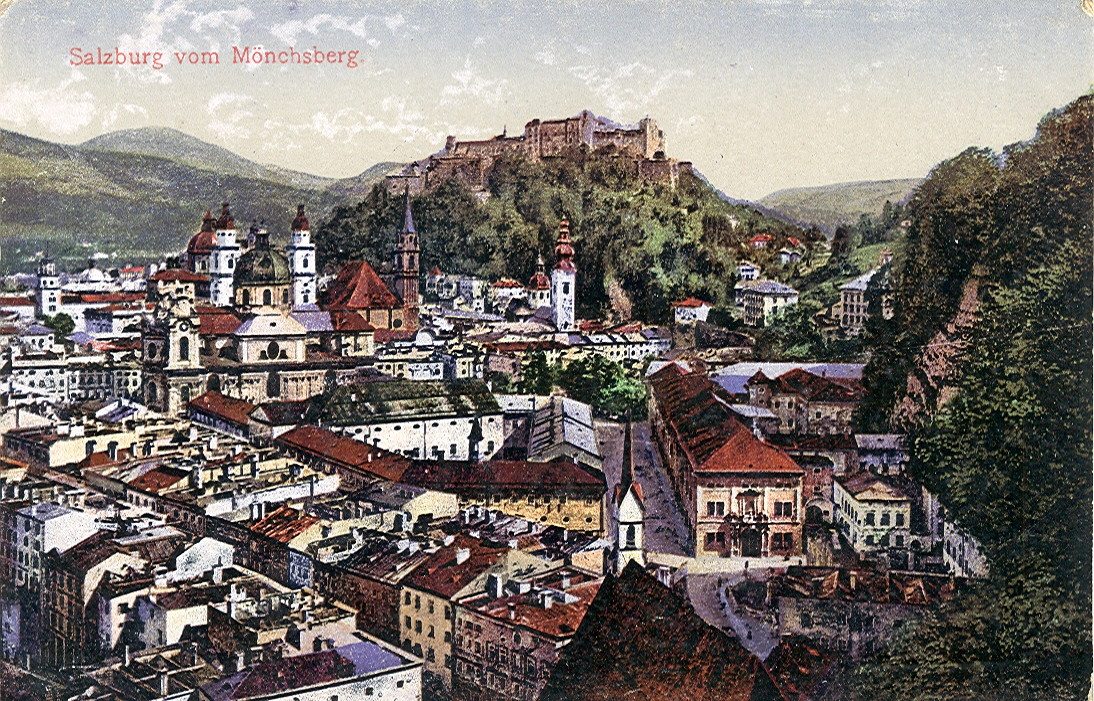
Salzburg in 1914; cathedral on the left, Hohensalzburg Fortress in the background

=== 20th century ===
==== First Republic ====
Following World War I and the dissolution of the Austro-Hungarian Empire, Salzburg, as the capital of one of the Austro-Hungarian territories, became part of the new German Austria. In 1918, it represented the residual German-speaking territories of the Austrian heartlands. This was replaced by the First Austrian Republic in 1919, after the Treaty of Saint-Germain-en-Laye (1919).

==== Annexation by Nazi Germany ====
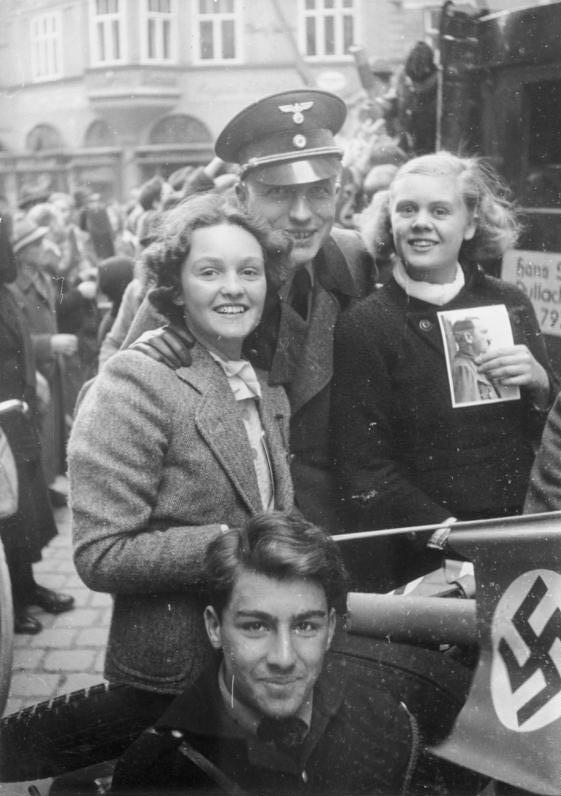
Young Austrians at celebrations just after the Anschluss, March 1938

The Anschluss (the occupation and annexation of Austria, including Salzburg, into Nazi Germany) took place on 12 March 1938, one day before a scheduled referendum on Austria's independence. German troops moved into the city. Political opponents, Jewish citizens and other minorities were subsequently arrested and deported to concentration camps. The synagogue was destroyed.

==== World War II ====
After Germany invaded the Soviet Union, several POW camps for prisoners from the Soviet Union and other enemy nations were arranged in the city.

During the Nazi occupation, a Romani camp was built in Salzburg-Maxglan. It was an Arbeitserziehungslager (work 'education' camp), which provided slave labor to local industry. It also operated as a Zwischenlager (transit camp), holding Roma before their deportation to German camps or ghettos in German-occupied territories in Eastern Europe.

Salzburg was also the location of five subcamps of the Dachau concentration camp.

Allied bombing destroyed 7,600 houses and killed 550 inhabitants. Fifteen air strikes destroyed 46 percent of the city's buildings, especially those around Salzburg railway station. Although the town's bridges and the dome of the cathedral were destroyed, much of its Baroque architecture remained intact. As a result, Salzburg is one of the few remaining examples of a town of its style. American troops entered the city on 5 May 1945, and it became the centre of the American-occupied area in Austria. Several displaced persons camps were established in Salzburg—, among them Riedenburg, Camp Herzl (Franz-Josefs-Kaserne), Camp Mülln, Bet Bialik, Bet Trumpeldor, and New Palestine.

==== Today ====
After World War II, Salzburg became the capital city of the Federal State of Salzburg (Land Salzburg) and saw the Americans leave the area once Austria had signed a 1955 treaty re-establishing the country as a democratic and independent nation and subsequently declared its perpetual neutrality. In the 1960s, the city became the shooting location and setting of the family musical film The Sound of Music. On 27 January 2006, the 250th anniversary of the birth of Wolfgang Amadeus Mozart, all 35 churches of Salzburg rang their bells after 8:00 p.m. (local time) to celebrate the occasion. Major celebrations took place throughout the year.

As of 2017 Salzburg had a GDP per capita of €46,100, which was greater than the average for Austria and most European countries.

== Geography ==
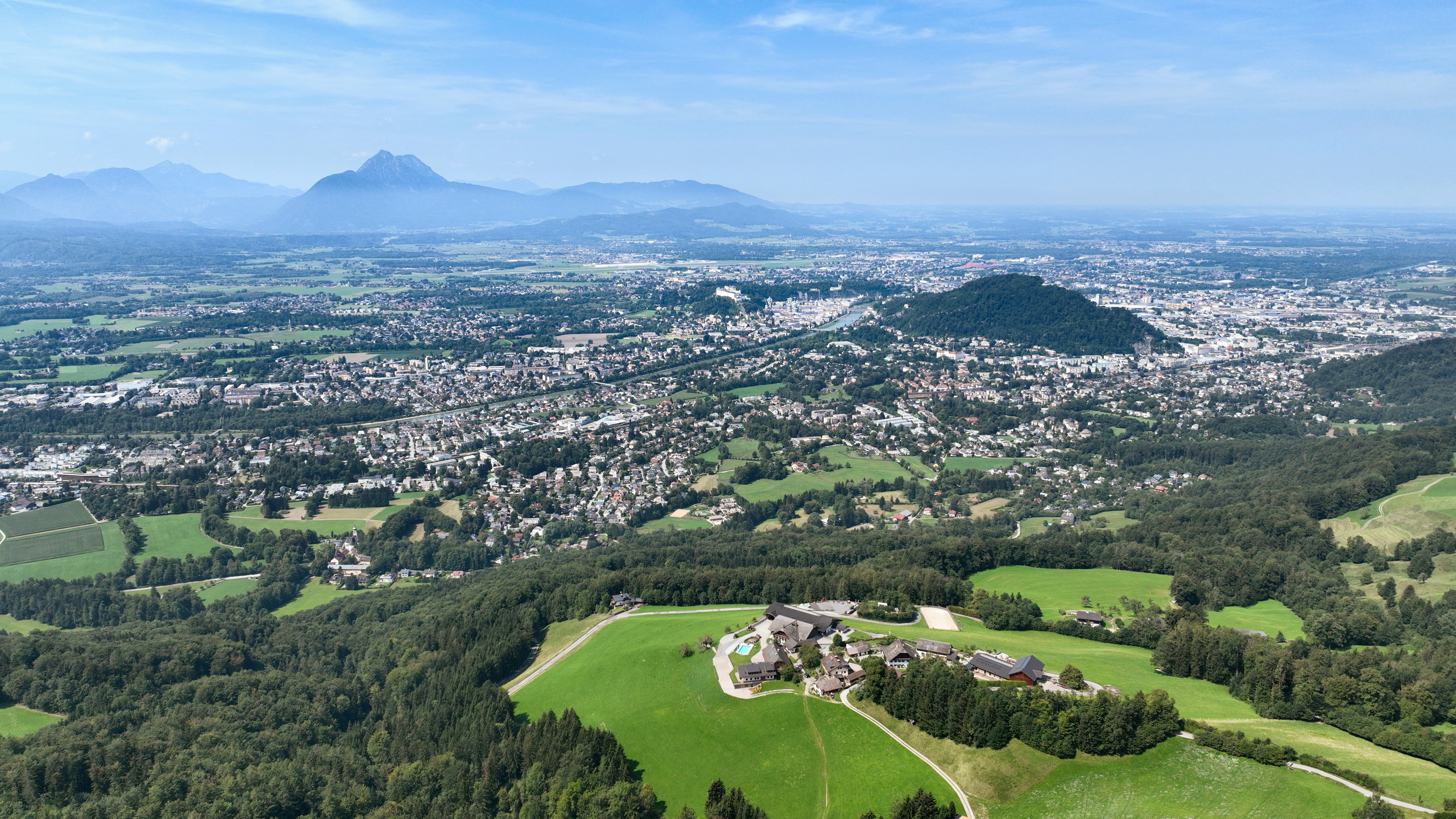
Eastern view of the Salzburg Basin with the city of Salzburg in the centre

Salzburg is on the banks of the River Salzach, at the northern boundary of the Alps. The mountains to Salzburg's south contrast with the rolling plains to the north. The closest alpine peak, the 1,972-metre-high (6,470 ft) Untersberg, is less than 16 km (10 mi) from the city centre. The Altstadt, or "old town", is dominated by its baroque towers and churches and the massive Hohensalzburg Fortress. This area is flanked by two smaller hills, the Mönchsberg and Kapuzinerberg, which offer green relief within the city. Salzburg is approximately 150 km (93 mi) east of Munich, 281 km (175 mi) northwest of Ljubljana, Slovenia, and 300 km (186 mi) west of Vienna. Salzburg has about the same latitude as Seattle.

Due to its proximity to the Austrian-German border, the greater Salzburg urban area has sometimes (unofficially) been thought of as if it included contiguous parts of Germany: Freilassing (until 1923 known as Salzburghofen), Ainring, and Piding. Public transport planning and multiple public transport lines stretch across the border.

=== Climate ===
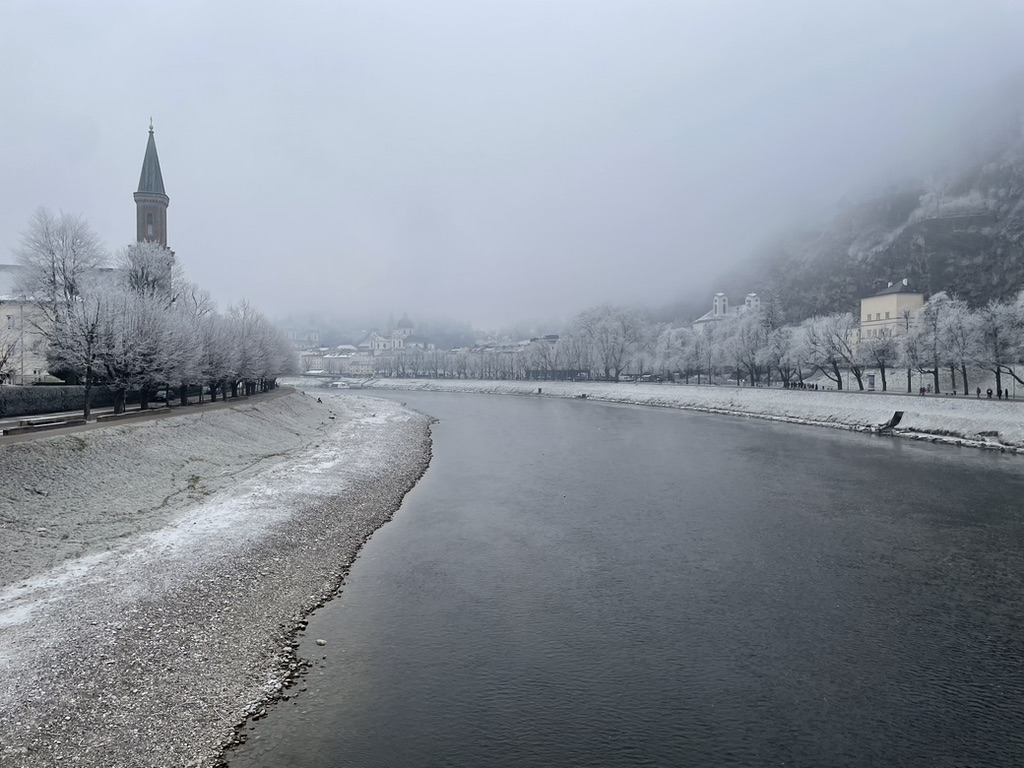
Winter fog looking south on the Müllnersteg over the Salzach, December 2024

Salzburg has a borderline warm-summer humid continental climate (Köppen: Dfb), with notable temperature differences between seasons and regular precipitation.

Salzburg's coldest month is January, with a daily mean of 0.0°C (32°F), which is exactly the isotherm that separates continental from oceanic climates in the Köppen climate classification. The city's warmest month is July, with a daily mean of 19.6°C.

Precipitation is evenly spread throughout the year, albeit with an uptick in rainfall totals during the summer months.

Due to the location at the northern rim of the Alps, the amount of precipitation is comparatively high, mainly in the summer months. The specific drizzle is called Schnürlregen in the local dialect. In winter and spring, pronounced foehn winds regularly occur, causing a rapid thaw of any snow cover.

Snowfall is common in winter and can occasionally be heavy, however prevailing southerly winds and occasional foehn effects temper the climate more than one might expect. Climate change has also reduced the frequency of snowfall events in the city, and it is likely that in future climatological averages, the city will transition to an oceanic climate.

Climate data for Salzburg-Flughafen (LOWS) 1991–2020, extremes 1874–present
Month	Jan	Feb	Mar	Apr	May	Jun	Jul	Aug	Sep	Oct	Nov	Dec	Year
Record high °C (°F)	20.8 (69.4)	21.7 (71.1)	24.9 (76.8)	30.3 (86.5)	34.1 (93.4)	35.7 (96.3)	37.7 (99.9)	36.6 (97.9)	33.3 (91.9)	28.2 (82.8)	24.1 (75.4)	19.1 (66.4)	37.7 (99.9)
Mean maximum °C (°F)	11.2 (52.2)	13.5 (56.3)	19.1 (66.4)	23.4 (74.1)	27.6 (81.7)	30.9 (87.6)	32.7 (90.9)	32.2 (90.0)	27.2 (81.0)	22.0 (71.6)	15.1 (59.2)	10.7 (51.3)	33.6 (92.5)
Mean daily maximum °C (°F)	3.4 (38.1)	6.2 (43.2)	10.2 (50.4)	15.7 (60.3)	19.3 (66.7)	23.2 (73.8)	24.3 (75.7)	24.0 (75.2)	19.9 (67.8)	14.4 (57.9)	8.5 (47.3)	4.0 (39.2)	14.4 (57.9)
Daily mean °C (°F)	0.0 (32.0)	1.6 (34.9)	5.7 (42.3)	10.1 (50.2)	14.4 (57.9)	17.9 (64.2)	19.6 (67.3)	19.4 (66.9)	15.0 (59.0)	10.4 (50.7)	4.8 (40.6)	0.9 (33.6)	10.0 (50.0)
Mean daily minimum °C (°F)	−3.6 (25.5)	−2.8 (27.0)	0.7 (33.3)	4.3 (39.7)	8.3 (46.9)	12.5 (54.5)	13.8 (56.8)	13.6 (56.5)	10.1 (50.2)	5.6 (42.1)	0.9 (33.6)	−2.5 (27.5)	5.1 (41.2)
Mean minimum °C (°F)	−11.2 (11.8)	−9.6 (14.7)	−4.9 (23.2)	−0.6 (30.9)	4.1 (39.4)	8.4 (47.1)	10.7 (51.3)	10.3 (50.5)	6.1 (43.0)	0.9 (33.6)	−3.6 (25.5)	−9.1 (15.6)	−13.4 (7.9)
Record low °C (°F)	−30.4 (−22.7)	−30.6 (−23.1)	−21.6 (−6.9)	−9.2 (15.4)	−3.4 (25.9)	−0.1 (31.8)	3.7 (38.7)	2.0 (35.6)	−3.0 (26.6)	−8.3 (17.1)	−18.0 (−0.4)	−27.7 (−17.9)	−30.6 (−23.1)
Average precipitation mm (inches)	59 (2.3)	53 (2.1)	87 (3.4)	78 (3.1)	115 (4.5)	151 (5.9)	158 (6.2)	164 (6.5)	112 (4.4)	73 (2.9)	72 (2.8)	72 (2.8)	1,195 (47.0)
Average snowfall cm (inches)	20.0 (7.9)	19.5 (7.7)	11.5 (4.5)	1.4 (0.6)	0.0 (0.0)	0.0 (0.0)	0.0 (0.0)	0.0 (0.0)	0.0 (0.0)	0.6 (0.2)	6.5 (2.6)	18.8 (7.4)	78.3 (30.8)
Average snowy days (≥ 1.0 cm)	14.6	12.2	5.6	0.8	0.0	0.0	0.0	0.0	0.0	0.2	3.8	10.0	47.2
Average relative humidity (%) (at 14:00)	71.7	63.5	56.1	50.5	53.0	54.6	53.2	55.0	59.3	62.9	71.1	73.9	60.4
Mean monthly sunshine hours	67.0	91.9	130.0	152.6	196.4	193.9	221.1	202.8	167.7	129.7	81.2	62.8	1,697.1
Percentage possible sunshine	26.9	34.4	37.9	39.4	44.3	43.7	48.8	48.3	47.4	42.9	30.8	26.7	39.3
Source 1: Central Institute for Meteorology and Geodynamics (precipitation 1981–2010, sun 1971–2000)
Source 2: Meteo Climat (record highs and lows)

Climate data for Salzburg-Flughafen (LOWS) 1961–1990 (Note: afternnon humidity measured at 14:00 local time)
Month	Jan	Feb	Mar	Apr	May	Jun	Jul	Aug	Sep	Oct	Nov	Dec	Year
Mean maximum °C (°F)	10.5 (50.9)	13.2 (55.8)	19.6 (67.3)	23.2 (73.8)	26.8 (80.2)	30.1 (86.2)	31.4 (88.5)	31.3 (88.3)	27.9 (82.2)	23.4 (74.1)	18.0 (64.4)	11.5 (52.7)	31.4 (88.5)
Mean daily maximum °C (°F)	2.4 (36.3)	4.9 (40.8)	9.5 (49.1)	14.1 (57.4)	18.9 (66.0)	21.8 (71.2)	23.8 (74.8)	23.4 (74.1)	20.1 (68.2)	15.1 (59.2)	8.0 (46.4)	3.2 (37.8)	13.8 (56.8)
Daily mean °C (°F)	−1.3 (29.7)	0.7 (33.3)	4.7 (40.5)	8.9 (48.0)	13.3 (55.9)	16.4 (61.5)	18.3 (64.9)	18.0 (64.4)	15.0 (59.0)	10.0 (50.0)	4.2 (39.6)	−0.3 (31.5)	9.0 (48.2)
Mean daily minimum °C (°F)	−5.0 (23.0)	−3.4 (25.9)	−0.1 (31.8)	3.7 (38.7)	7.7 (45.9)	11.1 (52.0)	12.9 (55.2)	12.7 (54.9)	9.9 (49.8)	5.0 (41.0)	0.4 (32.7)	−3.7 (25.3)	4.3 (39.7)
Mean minimum °C (°F)	−15.1 (4.8)	−11.9 (10.6)	−7.5 (18.5)	−1.9 (28.6)	1.5 (34.7)	5.3 (41.5)	7.8 (46.0)	7.1 (44.8)	3.8 (38.8)	−1.6 (29.1)	−7.5 (18.5)	−14.0 (6.8)	−15.1 (4.8)
Average precipitation mm (inches)	63.4 (2.50)	59.1 (2.33)	66.1 (2.60)	82.9 (3.26)	128.6 (5.06)	154.3 (6.07)	160.0 (6.30)	152.8 (6.02)	89.9 (3.54)	68.0 (2.68)	73.9 (2.91)	71.4 (2.81)	1,170.4 (46.08)
Average precipitation days (≥ 1.0 mm)	10.7	10	11.1	12.3	13.3	15.1	14.5	13.8	10	8.6	10.2	11.6	141.2
Average relative humidity (%)	82	79	74	70	69	71	71	75	78	80	81	82	76
Average afternoon relative humidity (%)	74	67	58	54	53	56	55	57	60	63	70	76	62
Average dew point °C (°F)	−3.7 (25.3)	−2.9 (26.8)	−0.6 (30.9)	2.8 (37.0)	7.2 (45.0)	10.6 (51.1)	12.5 (54.5)	12.7 (54.9)	10.5 (50.9)	6.0 (42.8)	0.7 (33.3)	−2.7 (27.1)	4.4 (40.0)
Mean monthly sunshine hours	68.2	90.4	130.2	153	189.1	201	223.2	201.5	174	139.5	78	62	1,710.1
Mean daily sunshine hours	2.2	3.2	4.2	5.1	6.1	6.7	7.2	6.5	5.8	4.5	2.6	2	4.7
Source 1: Deutscher Wetterdienst
Source 2: NOAA(mean monthly max/min-Dew Point)

== Demography ==
=== History ===
Historical population
Year	Pop.	±%
1869	27,858	—
1880	33,241	+19.3%
1890	38,081	+14.6%
1900	48,945	+28.5%
1910	56,423	+15.3%
1923	60,026	+6.4%
1934	69,447	+15.7%
1939	77,170	+11.1%
1951	102,927	+33.4%
1961	108,114	+5.0%
1971	129,919	+20.2%
1981	139,426	+7.3%
1991	143,978	+3.3%
2001	142,662	−0.9%
2011	145,270	+1.8%
2021	154,604	+6.4%
2026	157,994	+2.2%
Source: Statistik Austria

Salzburg's official population significantly increased in 1935 when the city absorbed adjacent municipalities. After World War II, numerous refugees found a new home in the city. New residential space was constructed for American soldiers of the postwar occupation and could be used for refugees when they left. Around 1950, Salzburg passed the mark of 100,000 citizens, and in 2016, it reached the mark of 150,000 citizens.

=== Migrant communities ===
Salzburg is home to large German, Bosnian, Serbian, and Romanian communities.

Largest groups of foreign residents
Nationality	Population (2026)
Germany	8,201
Bosnia and Herzegovina	5,040
Serbia	4,597
Romania	3,243
Syria	2,817
Croatia	2,692
Turkey	2,486
Afghanistan	2,125
Hungary	1,749
Ukraine	1,667
Italy	1,495
Russian Federation	1,164
Bulgaria	937
Kosovo	775
North Macedonia	608
Poland	544
Iran	525
Slovenia	472
Slovakia	453
Iraq	336
Czech Republic	247

== Architecture ==
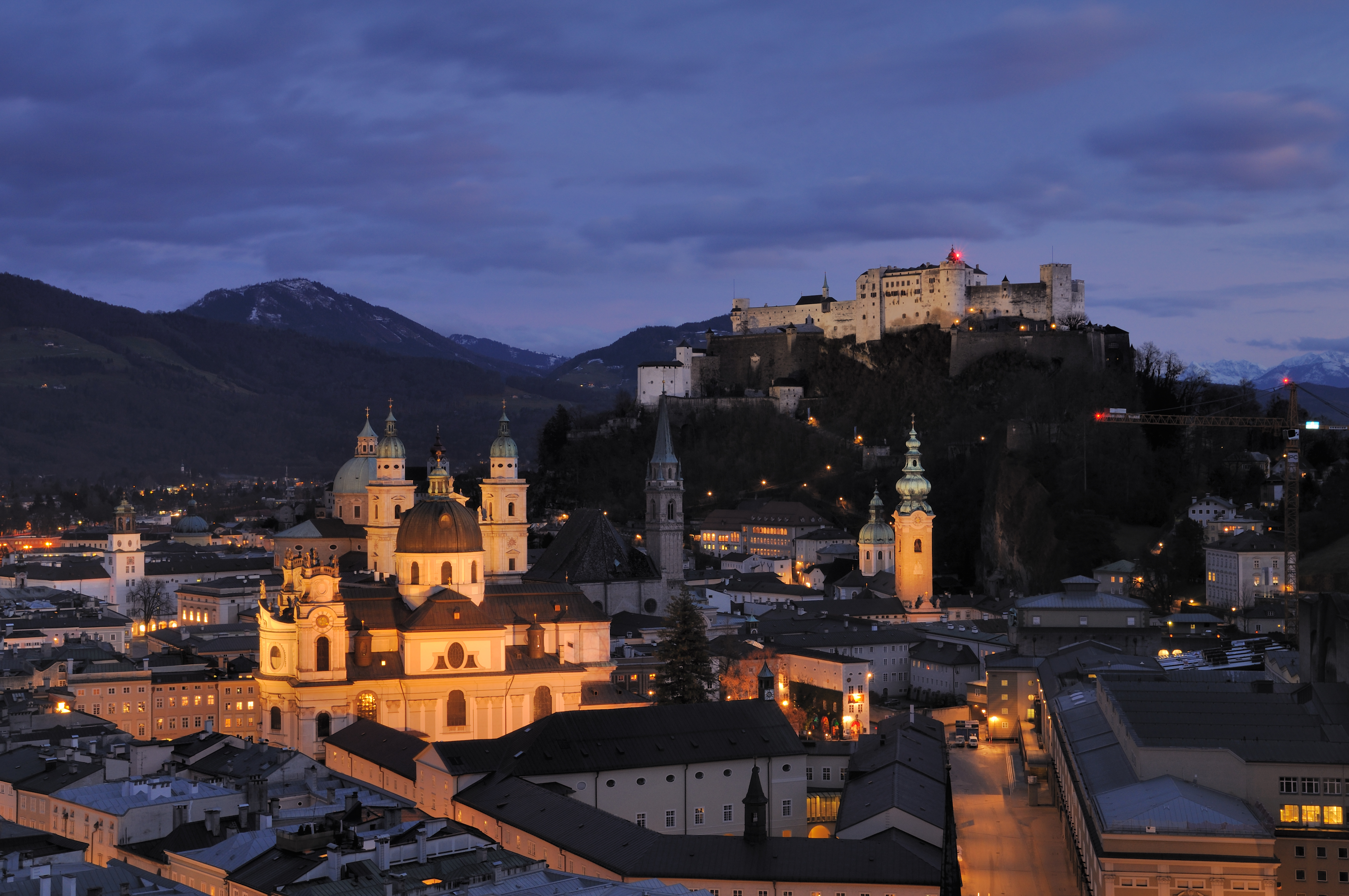
View from Mönchsberg (left to right), Kollegienkirche (right behind Salzburger Dom), Franziskanerkirche, St Peter's Abbey, Salzburg and, in the background, Hohensalzburg Fortress

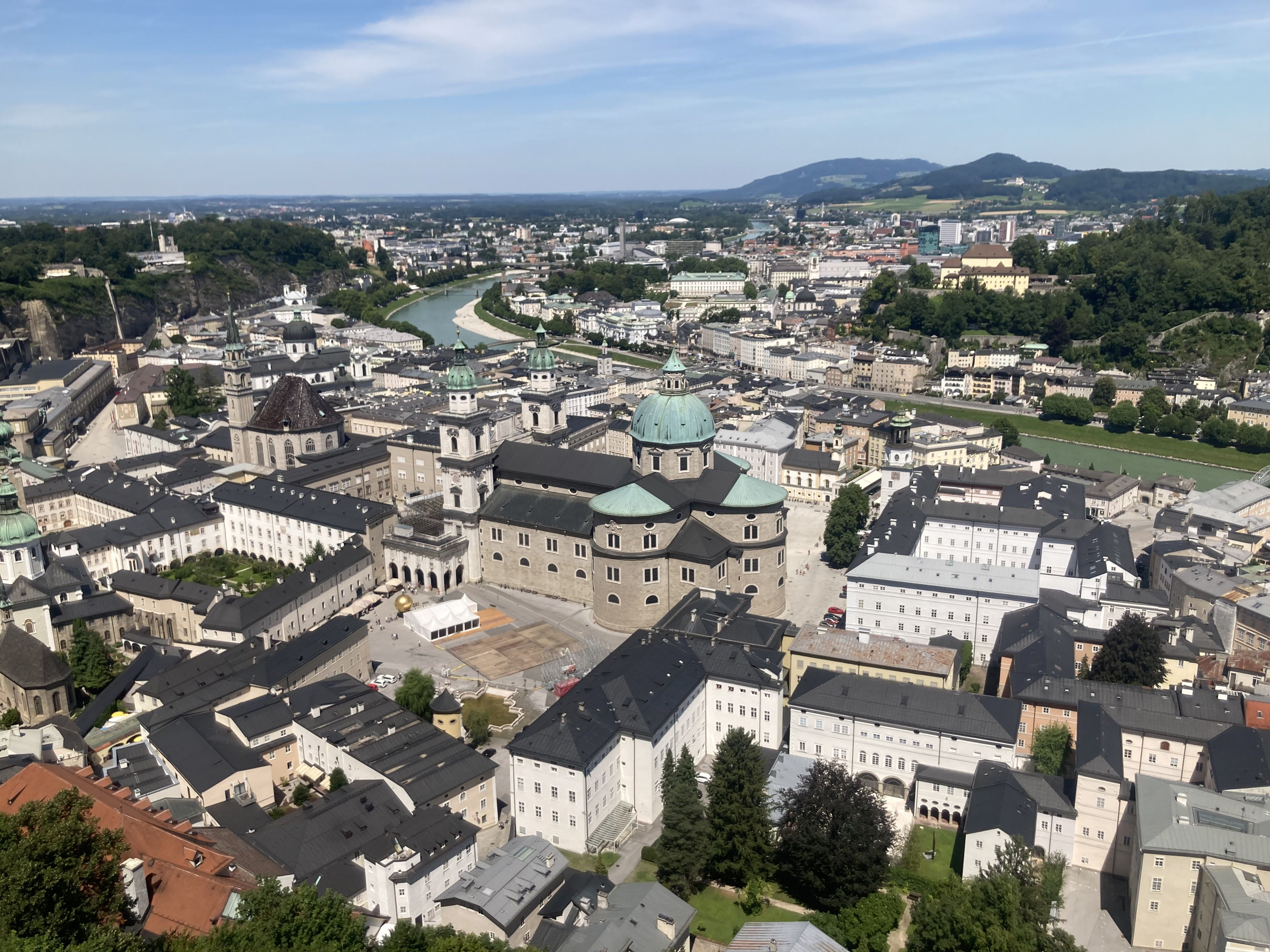
View from Hohensalzburg Fortress

=== Romanesque and Gothic ===
The Romanesque and Gothic churches, the monasteries and the early carcass houses dominated the medieval city for a long time. The Cathedral of Archbishop Conrad of Wittelsbach was the largest basilica north of the Alps. The choir of the Franciscan Church, initiated Hans von Burghausen and completed by Stephan Krumenauer, is one of the most prestigious religious Gothic constructions of southern Germany. At the end of the Gothic era, Nonnberg Abbey, the Margaret Chapel in St Peter's Abbey, St George's Chapel, and the stately halls of the "Hoher Stock" in Hohensalzburg Fortress were constructed.

=== Renaissance and baroque ===
Inspired by Vincenzo Scamozzi, Prince-Archbishop Wolf Dietrich von Raitenau began to transform the medieval town into the architectural ideals of the late Renaissance. Plans for a massive cathedral by Scamozzi failed to materialize upon the fall of the archbishop. A second cathedral planned by Santino Solari rose as the first early Baroque church in Salzburg. It served as an example for many other churches in Southern Germany and Austria. Markus Sittikus and Paris von Lodron continued to rebuild the city with major projects such as Hellbrunn Palace, the prince archbishop's residence, the university buildings, fortifications, and many other buildings. Giovanni Antonio Daria managed, by order of Prince Archbishop Guido von Thun, the construction of the residential well. Giovanni Gaspare Zuccalli, by order of the same archbishop, created the Erhard and the Kajetan church in the south of the town. The city's redesign was completed with buildings designed by Johann Bernhard Fischer von Erlach, donated by Prince Archbishop Johann Ernst von Thun.

After the era of Ernst von Thun, the city's expansion came to a halt, which is the reason why there are no churches built in the Rococo style. Sigismund von Schrattenbach continued with the construction of "Sigmundstor" and the statue of holy Maria on the cathedral square. With the fall and division of the former "Fürsterzbistum Salzburg" (Archbishopric) to Upper Austria, Bavaria (Rupertigau), and Tyrol (Zillertal Matrei) began a long period of urban stagnation. This era didn't end before the period of promoterism (Gründerzeit) brought new life into urban development. The builder dynasty Jakob Ceconi and Carl Freiherr von Schwarz filled major positions in shaping the city in this era.

=== Classical modernism and post-war modernism ===
Buildings of classical modernism and in particular, post-war modernism are frequently encountered in Salzburg. Examples are the Zahnwurzen house (a house in the Linzergasse 22 in the right centre of the old town), the "Lepi" (public baths in Leopoldskron) (built 1964), and the original 1957 constructed congress-centre of Salzburg, which was replaced by a new building in 2001. An important and famous example of the architecture of this era is the 1960 opening of the Großes Festspielhaus by Clemens Holzmeister.

=== Contemporary architecture ===
Adding contemporary architecture to Salzburg's old town without risking its UNESCO World Heritage status is problematic. Nevertheless, some new structures have been added: the Mozarteum at the Baroque Mirabell Garden (Architecture Robert Rechenauer), the 2001 Congress House (Architecture: Freemasons), the 2011 Unipark Nonntal (Architecture: Storch Ehlers Partners), the 2001 "Makartsteg" bridge (Architecture: HALLE1), and the "Residential and Studio House" of the architects Christine and Horst Lechner in the middle of Salzburg's old town (winner of the architecture award of Salzburg 2010). Other examples of contemporary architecture lie outside the old town: the Faculty of Science building (Universität Salzburg – Architecture Willhelm Holzbauer) built on the edge of free green space, the blob architecture of Red Bull Hangar-7 (Architecture: Volkmar Burgstaller) at Salzburg Airport, home to Dietrich Mateschitz's Flying Bulls and the Europark Shopping Centre. (Architecture: Massimiliano Fuksas)

== Districts ==
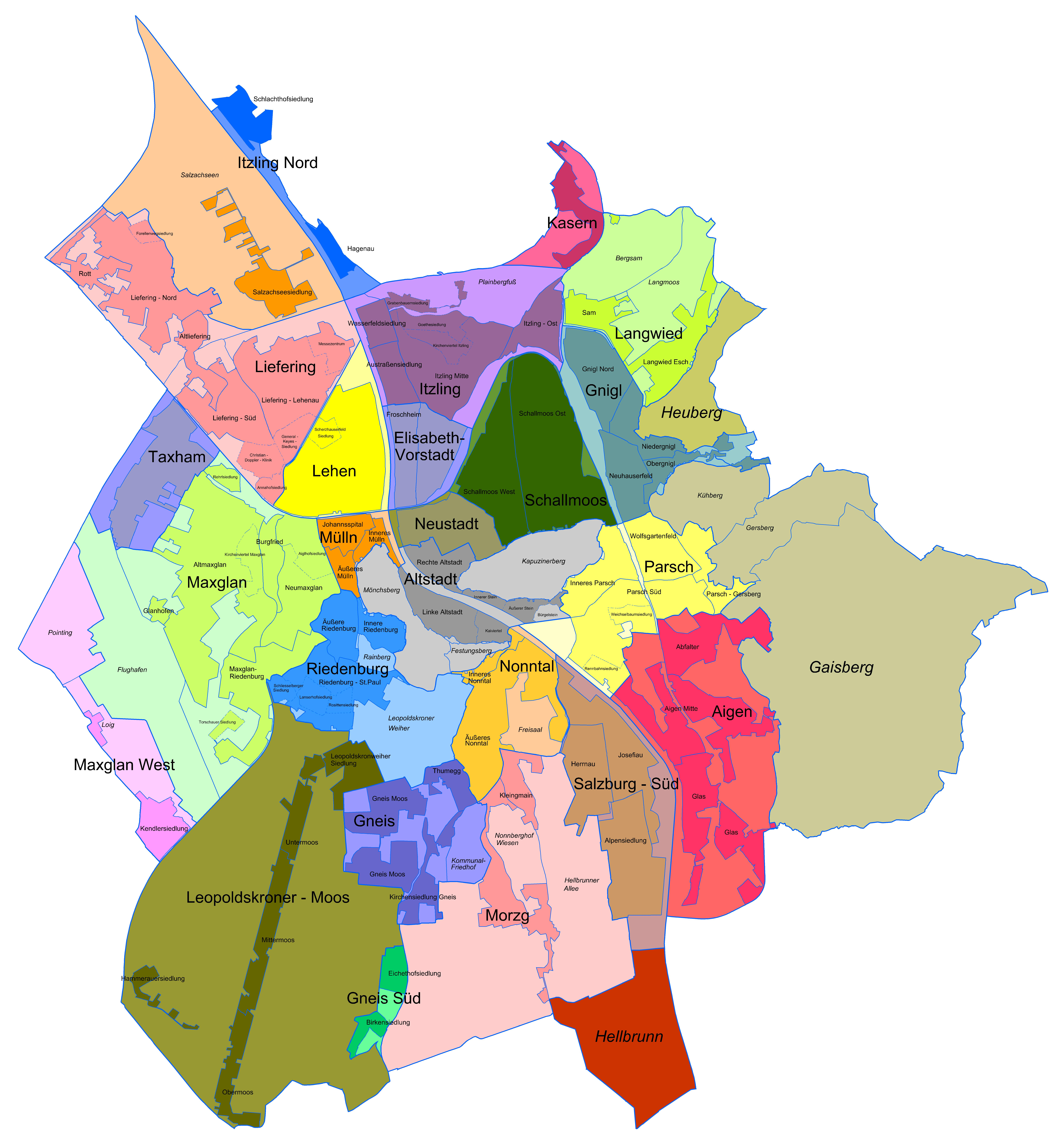
Districts of Salzburg

Salzburg can be divided into twenty-four urban districts (neighborhoods) and three landscape zones for spatial planning purposes.

Urban districts (Stadtteile):

- Aigen
- Altstadt
- Elisabeth-Vorstadt
- Gneis
- Gneis-Süd
- Gnigl
- Itzling
- Itzling-Nord
- Kasern
- Langwied
- Lehen
- Leopoldskron-Moos
- Liefering
- Maxglan
- Maxglan-West
- Morzg
- Mülln
- Neustadt
- Nonntal
- Parsch
- Riedenburg
- Salzburg-Süd
- Taxham
- Schallmoos

Landscape zones (Landschaftsräume):

- Gaisberg
- Hellbrunn
- Heuberg

== Main sights ==
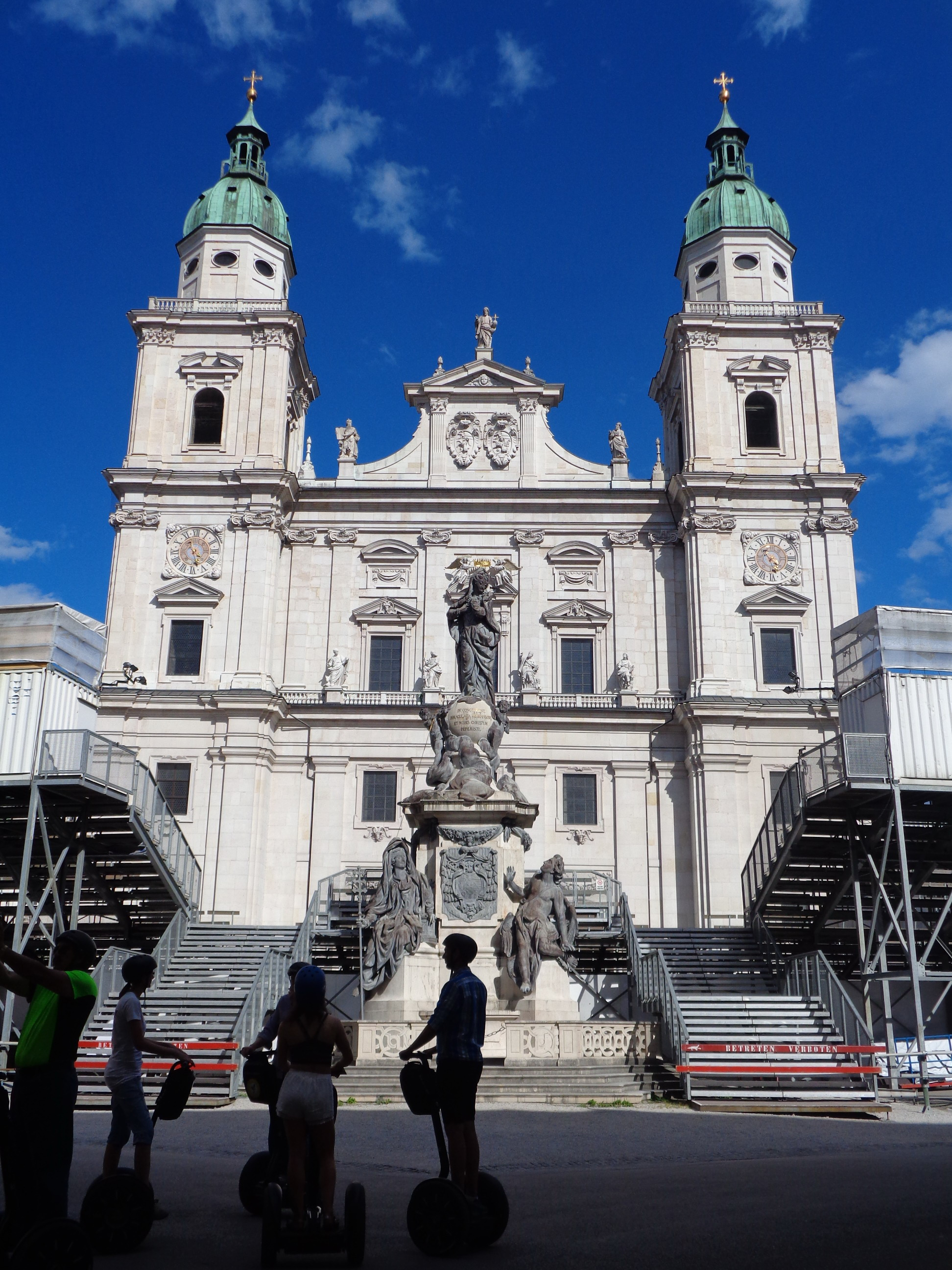
Salzburg Cathedral

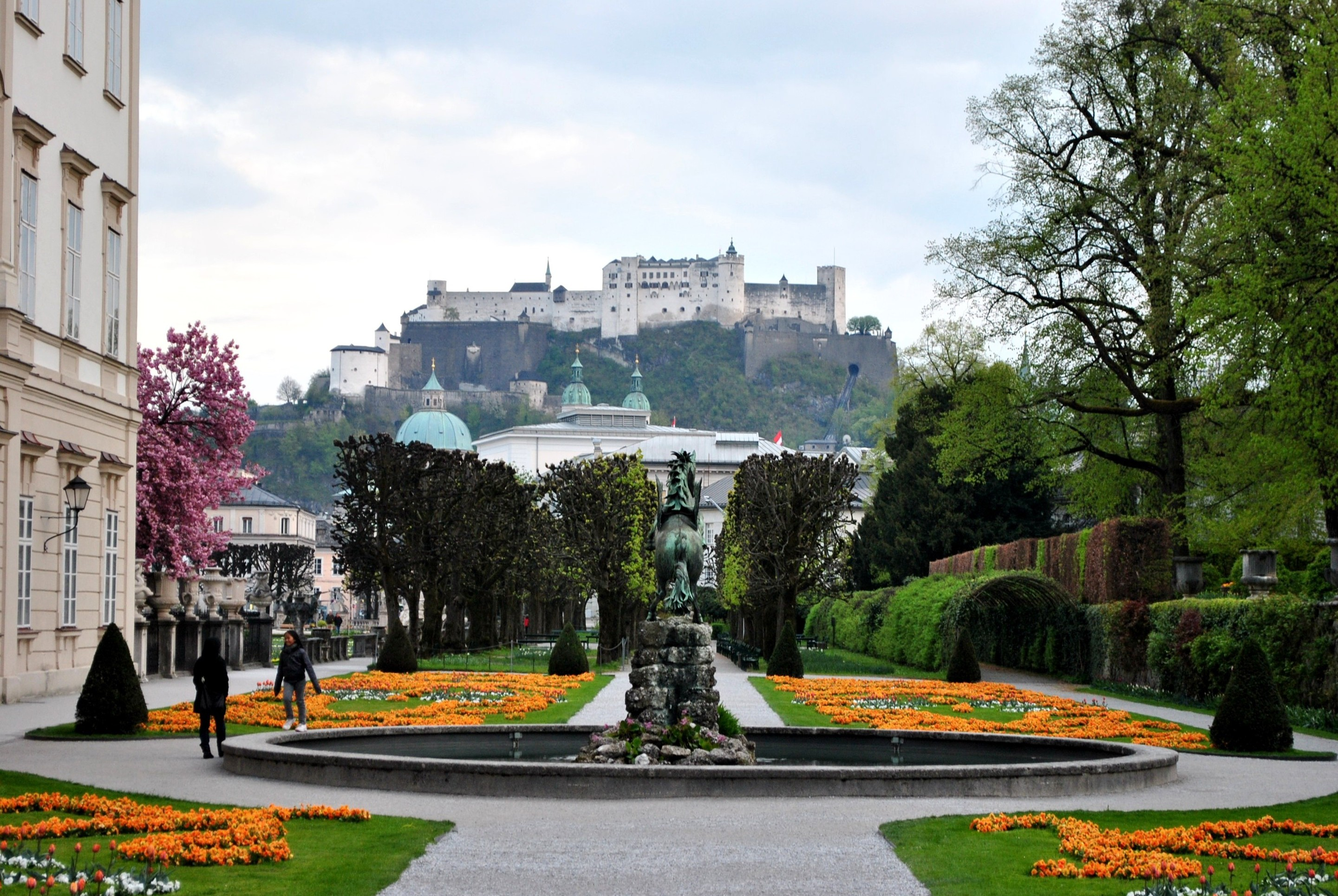
Gardens in Mirabell Palace, with Hohensalzburg Fortress in the distance

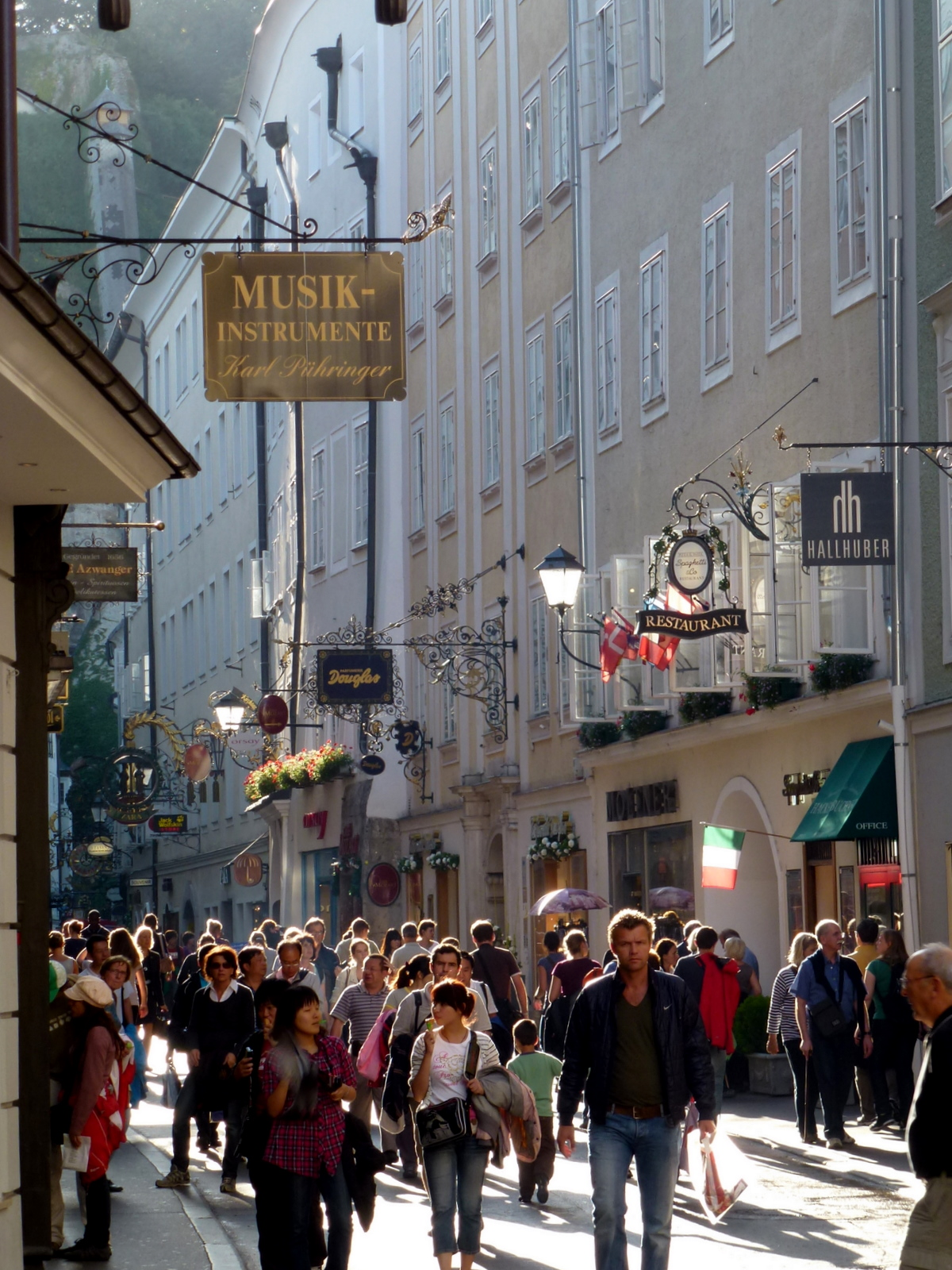
View of shoppers on Getreidegasse, which is one of the oldest streets in Salzburg

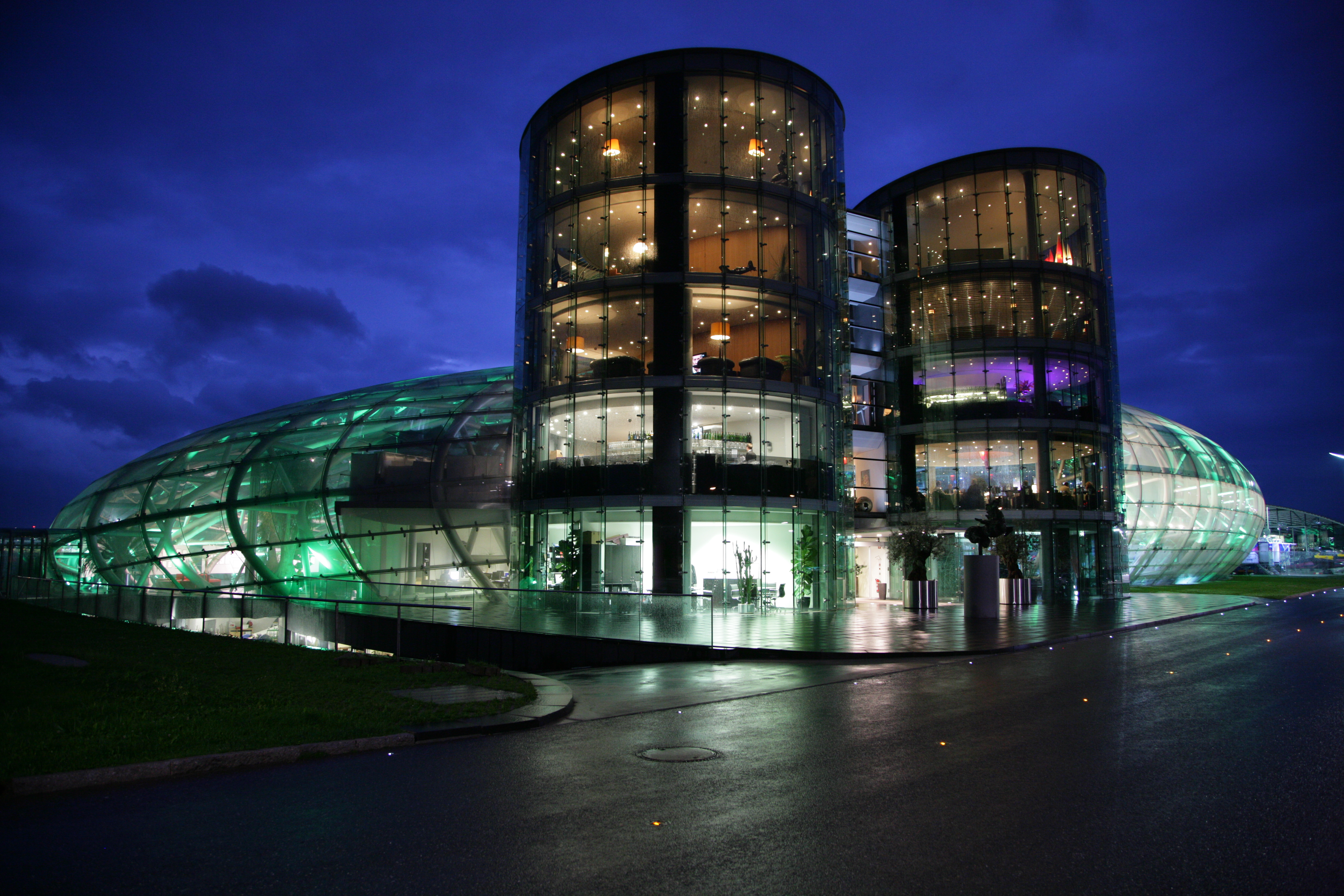
The Red Bull Hangar-7

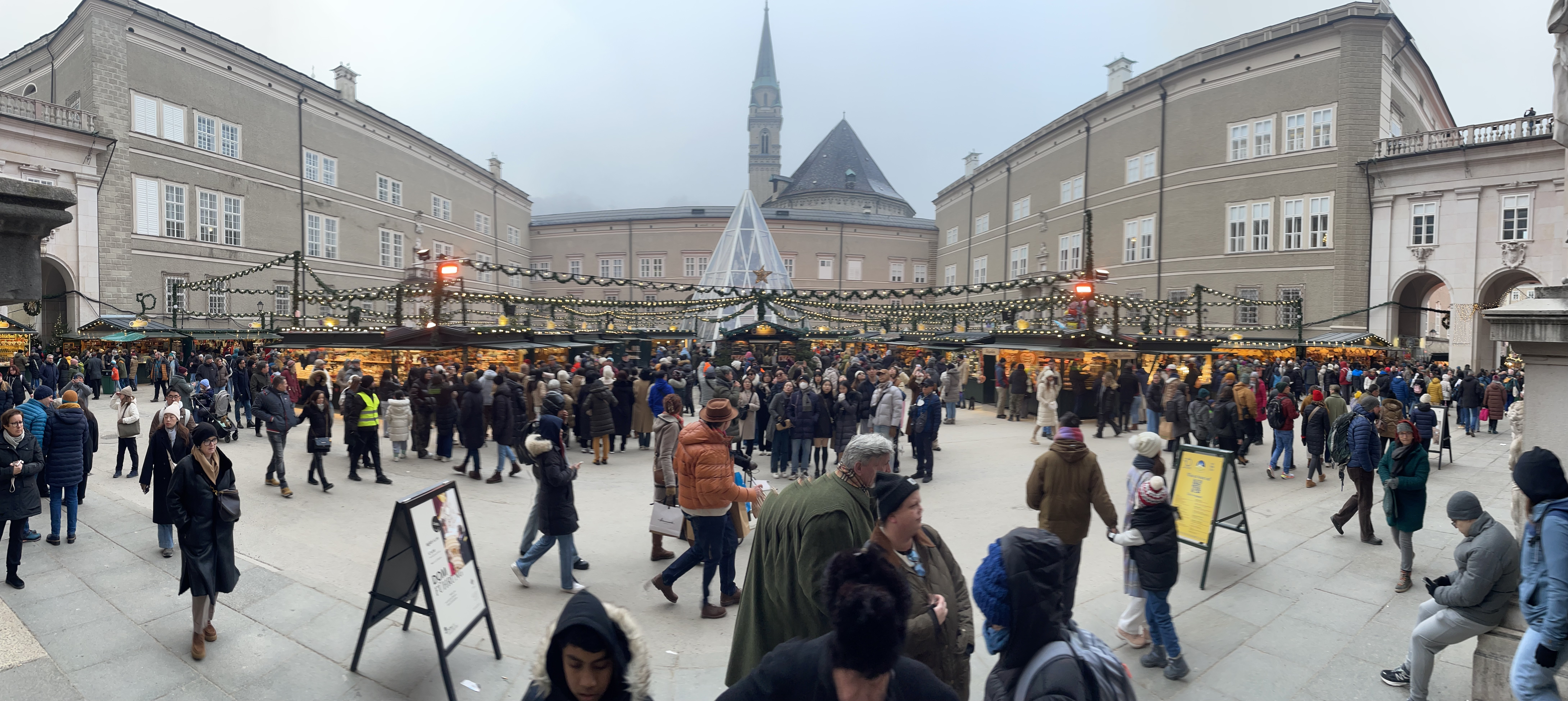
Christmas market in the Residenzplatz, December 2024

Salzburg is a tourist favourite, with the number of visitors outnumbering locals by a large margin in peak times. In addition to Mozart's birthplace noted above, other notable places include:

Old Town

- Historic centre of the city of Salzburg, a World Heritage Site
- Baroque architecture, including many churches
- Felsenreitschule, an open-air theatre built in the quarry used for the construction of Salzburg Cathedral
- Franziskanerkirche, one of Salzburg's oldest buildings, dating from 1208 and used by the Franciscans since 1642
- Getreidegasse, a busy, narrow shopping street characterised by numerous high townhouses
- Großes Festspielhaus, an opera house and concert hall dating from 1960 and built for the annual Salzburg Festival
- Haus für Mozart, formerly the Kleines Festspielhaus, an opera house and concert hall dating from 1925
- Hohensalzburg Fortress (Festung Hohensalzburg), overlooking the Old Town, is one of the largest castles in Europe
- Holy Trinity Church (Dreifaltigkeitskirche), dating from 1694
- Hotel Goldener Hirsch, a five-star hotel located in a building on Getreidegasse dating back to at least 1407
- Kollegienkirche, the Baroque style church of the University of Salzburg
- Mirabell Palace (Schloss Mirabell), a pleasure palace built in 1606 with wide gardens and a marble hall
- Museum der Moderne Salzburg, a modern art museum with locations in the old city and on the Mönchsberg
- Mozartplatz, a historic square with monument to Wolfgang Amadeus Mozart
- Mozart's birthplace (Mozarts Geburtshaus), a house in Getreidegasse that is now a museum dedicated to Mozart
- Nonnberg Abbey (Stift Nonnberg), a Benedictine monastery founded c.712/715
- Residenz, the former residence of the Prince-Archbishops
- Residenzgalerie, an art museum in the Residenz
- Residenzplatz, a large square outside the Residenz with a large and ornate fountain
- Salzburg Cathedral (Salzburger Dom)
- Salzburger Landestheater, a theatre and venue for opera, theatre, and dance, with resident companies of actors, singers, and dancers
- Salzburger Marionettentheater, a marionette theatre established in 1912
- Salzburg Museum, a museum of the artistic and cultural history of the city and region of Salzburg
- Sigmundstor, an eighteenth-century tunnel connecting the Altstadt with the Riedenburg quarter through the Mönchsberg
- Sphaera, a sculpture of a man on a golden sphere (Stephan Balkenhol, 2007)
- St Peter's Abbey (Stift Sankt Peter), a Benedictine monastery founded 696 with a well-known cemetery
- St Sebastian's Church (Sebastianskirche), a church consecrated in 1511

Outside the Old Town

- Schloss Leopoldskron, a rococo palace and national historic monument in Leopoldskron-Moos, a southern district of Salzburg
- Hellbrunn with its parks and castles
- The Sound of Music tour companies who operate tours of film locations
- Hangar-7, a multifunctional building owned by Red Bull, with a collection of historical aeroplanes, helicopters, and Formula One racing cars
- Haslachmühle, historic flour mill in the Gnigl district

Greater Salzburg area

- Anif Castle, located south of the city in Anif
- Shrine of Our Lady of Maria Plain, a late Baroque church on the northern edge of Salzburg
- Salzburger Freilichtmuseum Großgmain, an open-air museum containing old farmhouses from all over the state assembled in a historic setting
- Schloss Klessheim, a palace and casino, formerly used by Adolf Hitler
- Berghof, Hitler's mountain retreat near Berchtesgaden
- Kehlsteinhaus, the only remnant of Hitler's Berghof
- Salzkammergut, an area of lakes east of the city
- Untersberg mountain, next to the city on the Austria–Germany border, with panoramic views of Salzburg and the surrounding Alps
- Skiing is an attraction during winter. Salzburg has no skiing facilities, but it is a gateway to skiing areas to the south. During the winter, its airport receives charter flights from around Europe.
- Salzburg Zoo, located south of the city in Anif

== Education ==
Salzburg is a centre of education and home to three universities, as well as several professional colleges and gymnasiums (high schools).

=== Universities and higher education institutions ===
- University of Salzburg, a federal public university
- Paracelsus Medical University
- Mozarteum University Salzburg, a public music and dramatic arts university
- Fachhochschule Salzburg
- Alma Mater Europaea, a private university
- SEAD Salzburg Experimental Academy of Dance

== Notable citizens ==
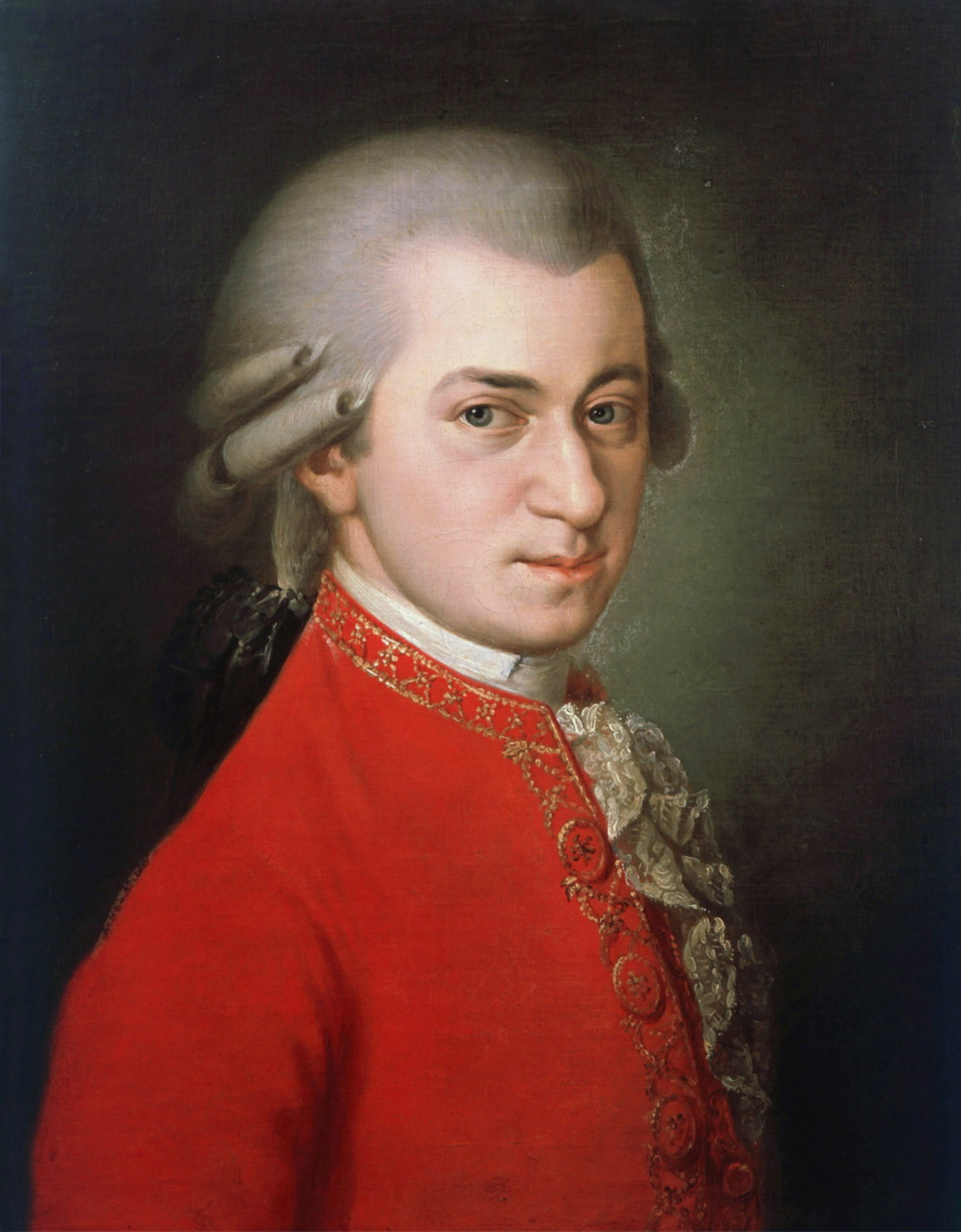
Mozart was born in Salzburg.

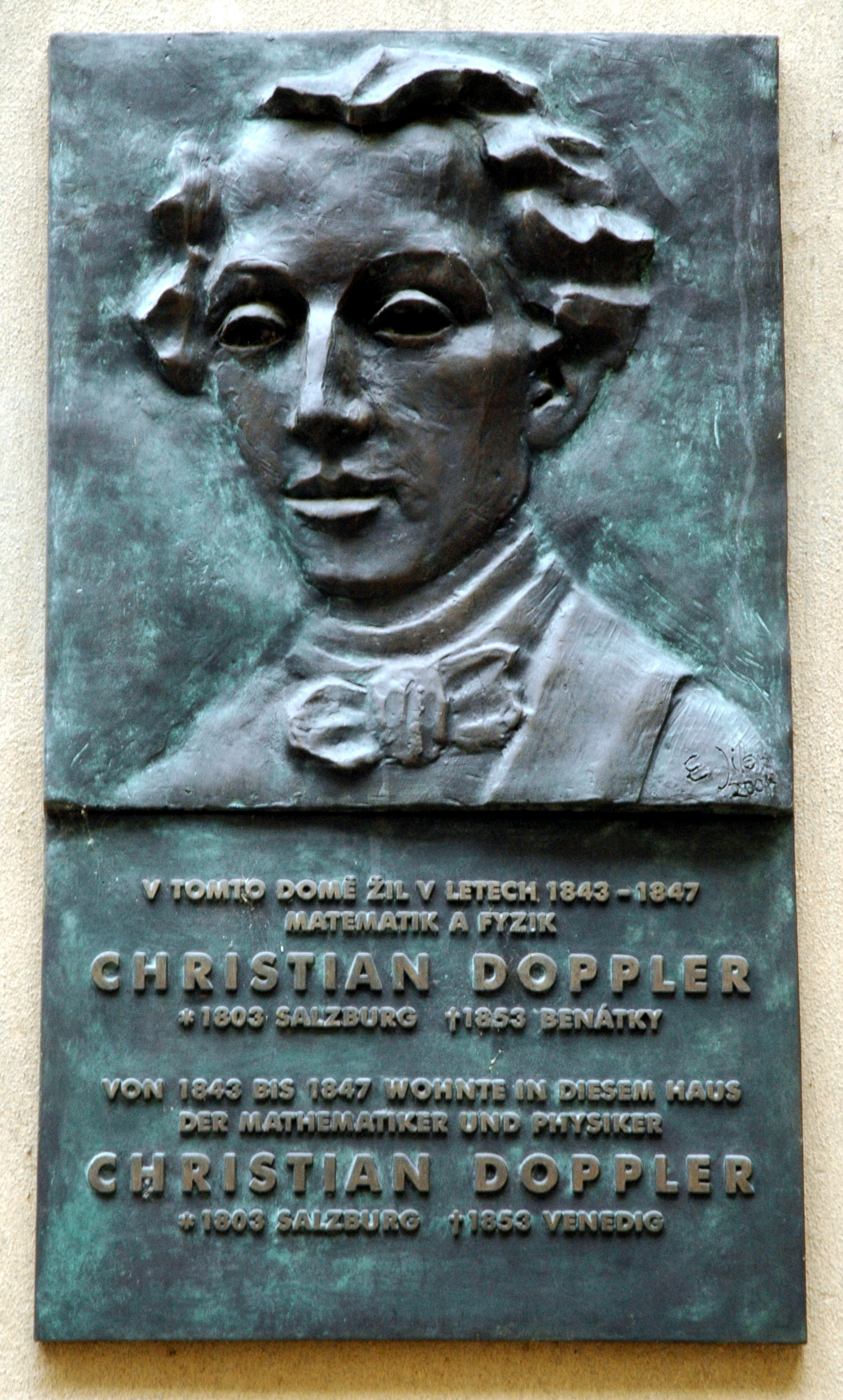
plaque of Christian Doppler, c. 1845

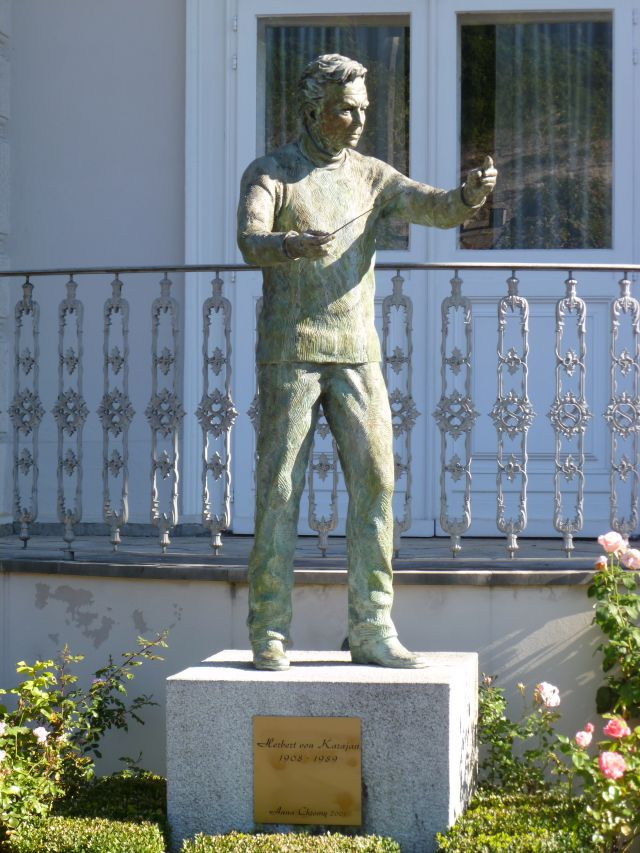
Herbert von Karajan statue in Salzburg

- Saint Liutberga (died c. 870), an influential nun in Saxony in the 9th century
- Paracelsus (ca 1493 – 1541), Swiss physician, alchemist, and astrologer of the German Renaissance.
- Barbara Thenn (1519–1579), merchant and Münzmeister
- Heinrich Biber (ca 1644-1704), violinist and composer in Salzburg from the early 1670s.
- Joseph Leutgeb (1732–1811), virtuoso horn player, was part of the archbishop's court.
- Johann Michael Haydn (1737–1806), composer and younger brother of the composer Joseph Haydn. His works were admired by Mozart and Schubert. He was also the teacher of Carl Maria von Weber and Anton Diabelli. He is known for his sacred music.
- Wolfgang Amadeus Mozart (1756–1791), composer, was born and raised in Salzburg when it was part of the Prince-Archbishopric of Salzburg within the Holy Roman Empire; he was employed as a musician at the archbishopal court from 1773 to 1781. His house of birth and residence are tourist attractions. His family is buried in a small church graveyard in the old town, and there are many monuments to "Wolferl" in the city.
- Ignaz Assmayer (1790–1862), Austrian composer of liturgical music.
- Joseph Mohr (1792–1848), Roman Catholic priest and writer, born in Salzburg. He wrote the text to "Silent Night", music by Franz Xaver Gruber, and they performed it for the first time on Christmas Eve 1818.
- Christian Doppler (1803–1853), expert on acoustic theory, born in Salzburg; discovered the Doppler effect.
- Georg Pezolt (1810–1878), painter, architect, art critic, and conservator, born in Salzburg.
- Marko Feingold (1913-2019), President of the synagogue in Salzburg.
- King Otto of Greece (1815–1867), was born Prince Otto Friedrich Ludwig of Bavaria at Mirabell Palace, a few days before the city reverted from Bavarian to Austrian rule.
- Hans Makart (1840–1884), influential Austrian painter-decorator, was born locally. Makartplatz (Makart Square) is named in his honour.
- Irma von Troll-Borostyani (1847–1912), Austrian writer, journalist, and campaigner for women's rights
- Ludwig Hans Fischer (1848–1915), landscape painter, copper engraver, etcher, and ethnologist.
- Theodor Herzl (1860–1904), an Austro-Hungarian Jewish journalist and political activist who was the father of modern political Zionism. He worked in the courts in Salzburg after he earned his law degree in 1884.
- Georg Trakl (1887–1914), an important voice in German Expressionism literature, was born in Salzburg.
- Georg von Trapp (1880–1947), Maria von Trapp (1905–1987), and their children made up the Trapp Family and lived in Salzburg until they fled to the United States following the Nazi takeover.
- Stefan Zweig (1881–1942), writer, lived in Salzburg for about 15 years, until 1934.
- Hilda Crozzoli (1900–1972), Austria's first female architect and civil engineer
- Herbert von Karajan (1908–1989), notable orchestral conductor, was born in Salzburg and died locally in Anif.
- Franz Krieger (1914–1993), businessman and photographer, born in Salzburg
- Thomas Bernhard (1931–1989), novelist, playwright, and poet, was raised in Salzburg, spent part of his life there.
- Alex Jesaulenko (born 1945), famous former Australian rules football-player
- Klaus Ager (born 1946), the distinguished contemporary composer and Mozarteum professor
- Roland Ratzenberger (1960–1994), Formula One racing driver, was born in Salzburg. He died practicing for the 1994 San Marino Grand Prix.
- Felix Baumgartner (1967-2025), record-setting skydiver and BASE jumper
- Ferdinand Habsburg (born 1997), racing driver, was born locally; he is heir apparent to the headship of the House of Habsburg-Lorraine

== Events ==
- The Salzburg Festival is a famous music and theatre festival that attracts visitors during July and August each year. A Salzburg Easter Festival and a Salzburg Whitsun Festival are also held each year over a shorter period.
- The Europrix multimedia award takes place in Salzburg.
- Electric Love Festival takes place in Salzburg.

== Transport ==
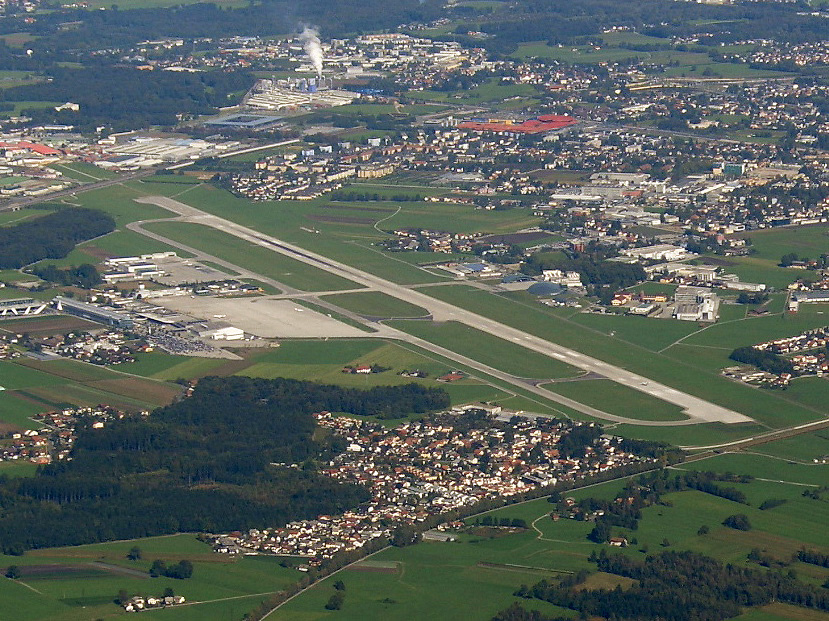
Salzburg Airport

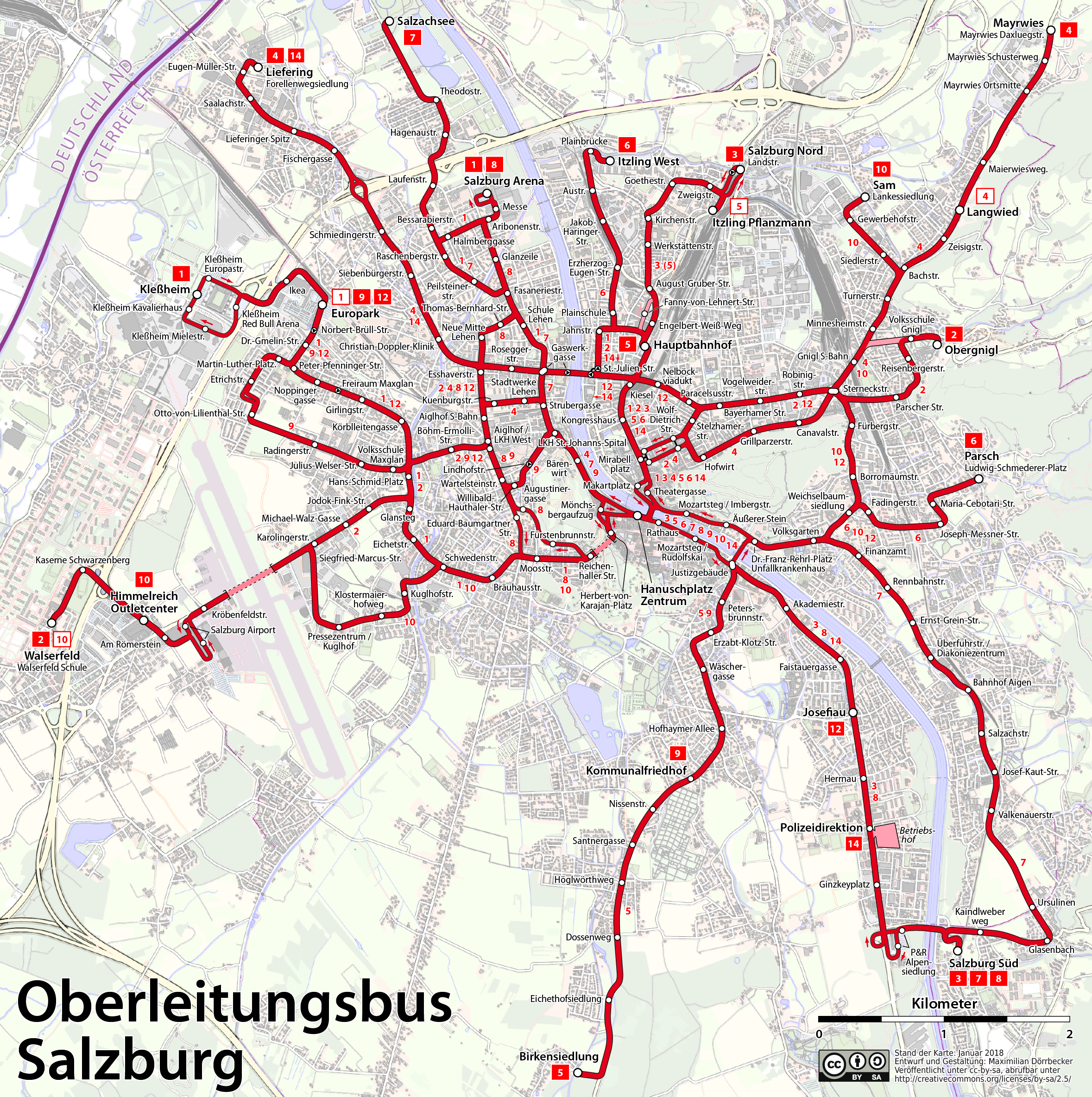
Map of the Salzburg trolleybus system

Salzburg Hauptbahnhof is served by comprehensive rail connections, with frequent east–west trains serving Vienna, Munich, Innsbruck, and Zürich, including daily high-speed ICE services. North–south rail connections also serve popular destinations such as Venice and Prague. The city acts as a hub for southbound trains through the Alps into Italy.

Salzburg Airport has scheduled flights to European cities such as Frankfurt, London, Rotterdam, Amsterdam, Brussels, Düsseldorf, and Zürich, as well as Naples, Hamburg, Edinburgh and Dublin. In addition to these, there are numerous charter flights. For other international travel, the nearest major international airport is Munich Airport, located 153 km (95 mi) north west of the city.

In the main city, there is the Salzburg trolleybus system and bus system with a total of more than 20 lines, and service every 10 minutes. Salzburg has an S-Bahn system with four Lines (S1, S2, S3, S11), trains depart from the main station every 30 minutes, and they are part of the ÖBB network. Suburb line number S1 reaches the world-famous Silent Night chapel in Oberndorf in about 25 minutes.

== Popular culture ==
In the 1960s, The Sound of Music, based on the true story of Maria von Trapp, who took up with an aristocratic family and fled the German Anschluss, used locations in Salzburg and Salzburg State as filming location.

The city briefly appears on the map when Indiana Jones travels through the city in the 1989 film Indiana Jones and the Last Crusade.

Salzburg is the setting for the Austrian crime series Stockinger and an Austrian-German television crime drama series Der Pass.

In the 2010 film Knight & Day, Salzburg serves as the backdrop for a large portion of the film.

Salzburg was featured as one of the mystery destinations on the NBC reality competition series Destination X in 2025.

== Language ==
Austrian German is widely written and differs from Germany's standard variation only in some vocabulary and a few grammar points. Salzburg belongs to the region of Austro-Bavarian dialects, in particular Central Bavarian. It is widely spoken by young and old alike although professors of linguistics from the Universität Salzburg, Irmgard Kaiser, and Hannes Scheutz, have seen over the past few years a reduction in the number of dialect speakers in the city. Although more and more school children are speaking standard German, Scheutz feels it has less to do with parental influence and more to do with media consumption.

== Sports ==
=== Football ===
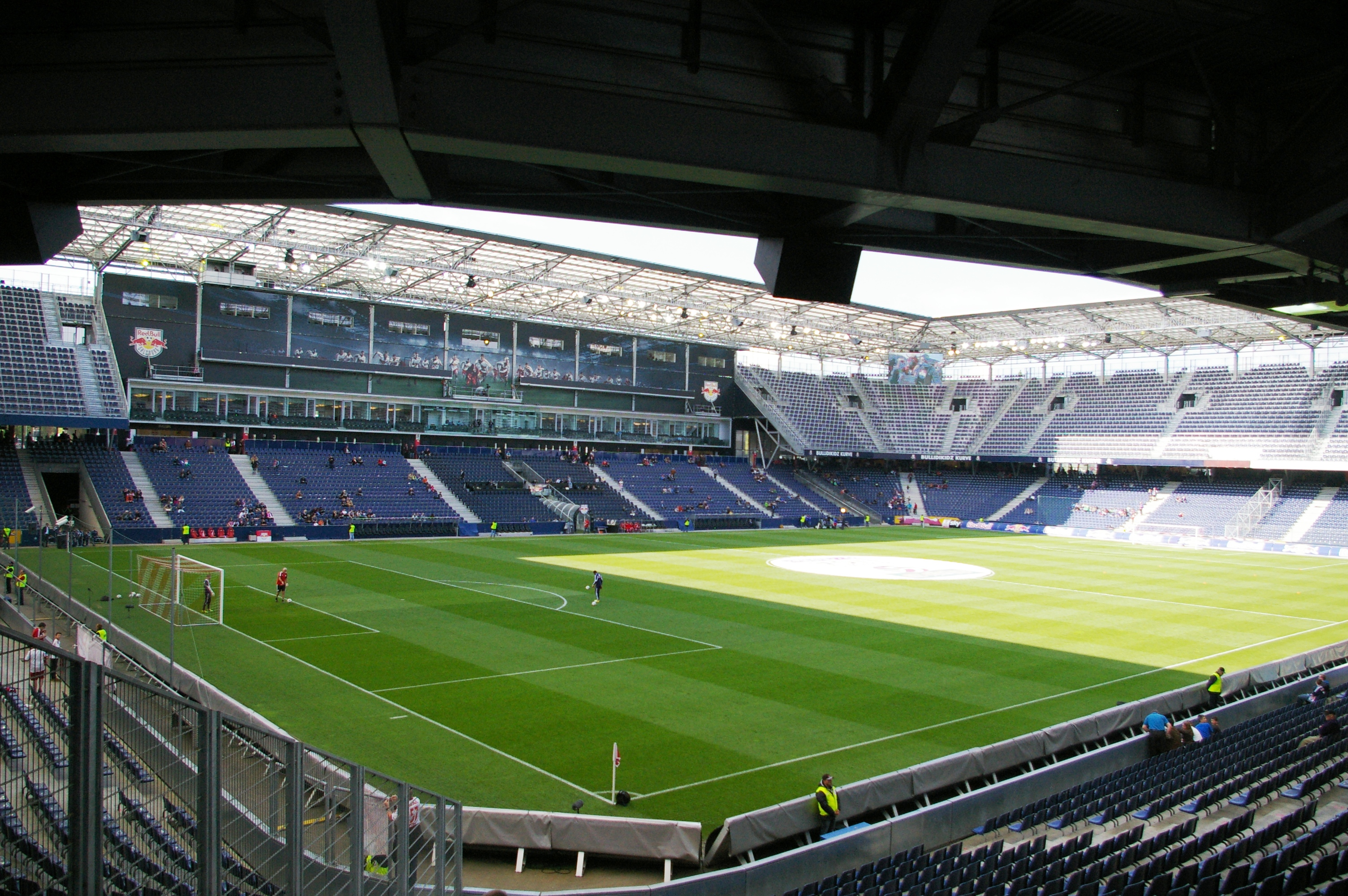
Stadion Wals-Siezenheim

The former SV Austria Salzburg reached the UEFA Cup final in 1994. On 6 April 2005, Red Bull bought the club and changed its name to FC Red Bull Salzburg. The home stadium of Red Bull Salzburg is the Wals Siezenheim Stadium in a suburb in the agglomeration of Salzburg and was one of the venues for the 2008 European Football Championship. FC Red Bull Salzburg plays in the Austrian Bundesliga.

After Red Bull had bought the SV Austria Salzburg and changed its name and team colors, some supporters of the club decided to leave and form a new club with the old name and old colors, wanting to preserve the traditions of their club. The reformed SV Austria Salzburg was founded in 2005 and at one point played in the Erste Liga. After financial difficulties, the club was temporarily relegated to the fourth division, but following repeated promotions (most recently in the 2024/25 season), it is now back in the second division.

=== Ice hockey ===
Red Bull also sponsors the local ice hockey team, the EC Salzburg Red Bulls. The team plays in the ICE Hockey League, which was formerly named Erste Bank Eishockey Liga, an Austria-headquartered cross-border league featuring the best teams from Austria, Hungary, Slovenia, Croatia, and Italy, as well as one Czech team.

=== Other sports ===
Salzburg was a candidate city for the 2010 and 2014 Winter Olympics, but lost to Vancouver and Sochi respectively.

== Twin towns ==
Salzburg is twinned with:

- Reims, Marne, Grand Est, France, since 1964
- Verona, Verona, Veneto, Italy, since 1973
- León, Nicaragua, since 1984
- Singida, Tanzania, since 1984
- Busseto, Parma, Emilia-Romagna, Italy, since 1988
- Vilnius, Lithuania, since 1989
- Dresden, Saxony, Germany, since 1991
- Supovsky, Russia, since 2016
- Kawasaki, Japan, since 1992
- Meran, South Tyrol, Trentino-Alto Adige/Südtirol, Italy, since 2000
- Shanghai, China, since 2004
- Jahrom, Iran, since 2019
- Leeds, England, since 2022

== Gallery ==
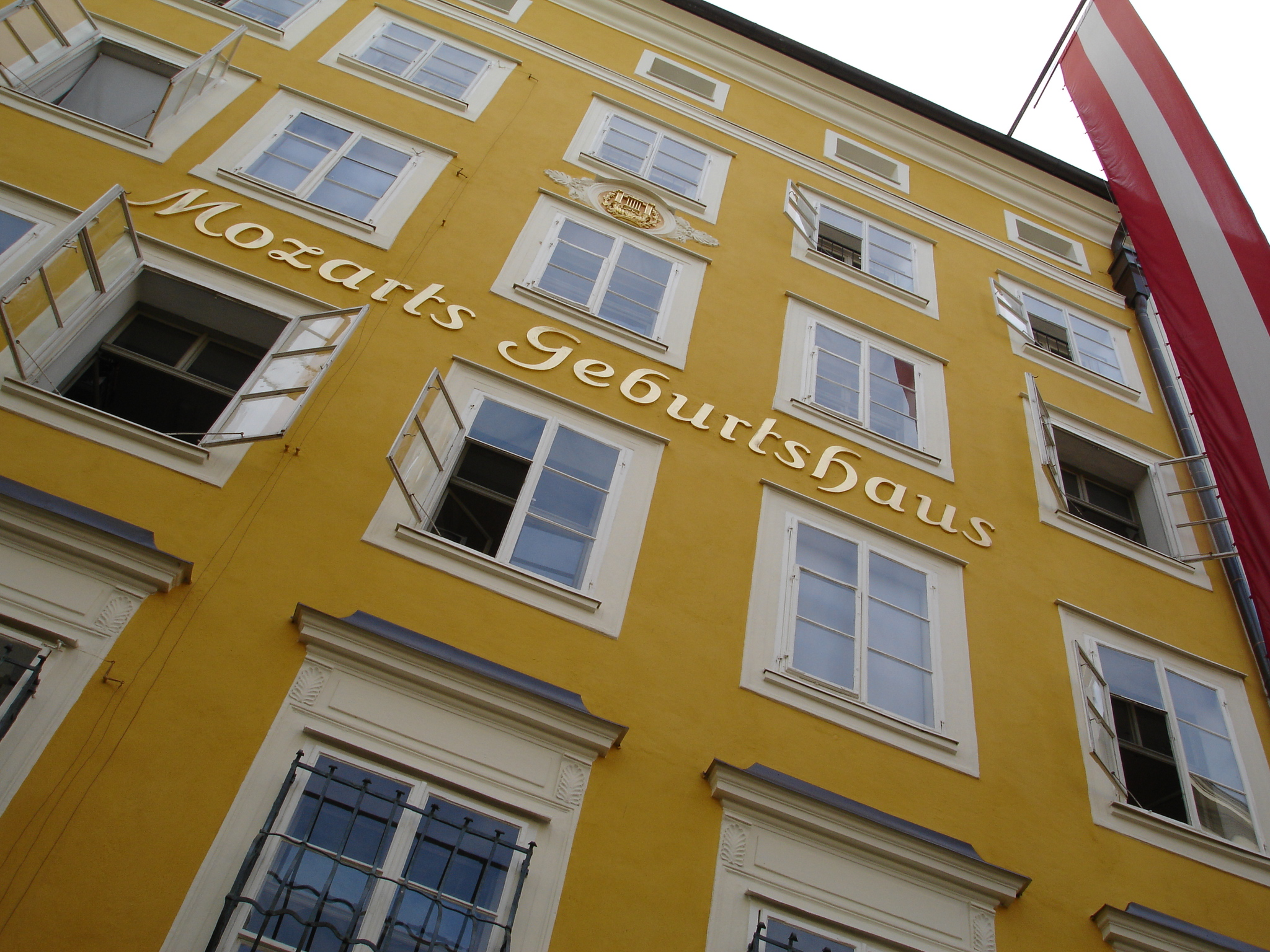
Mozart's birthplace at Getreidegasse 9

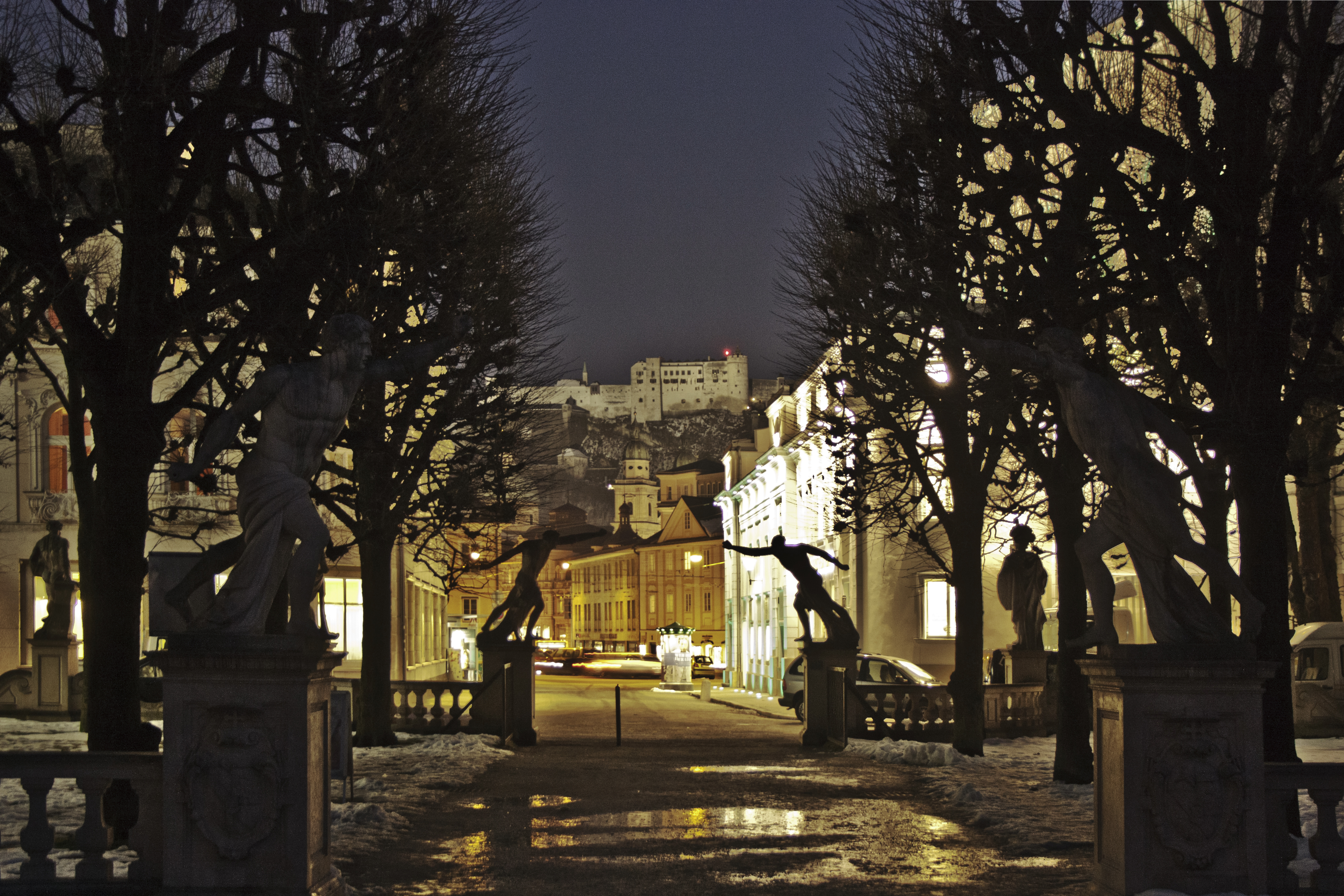
View from Mirabellgarten at night

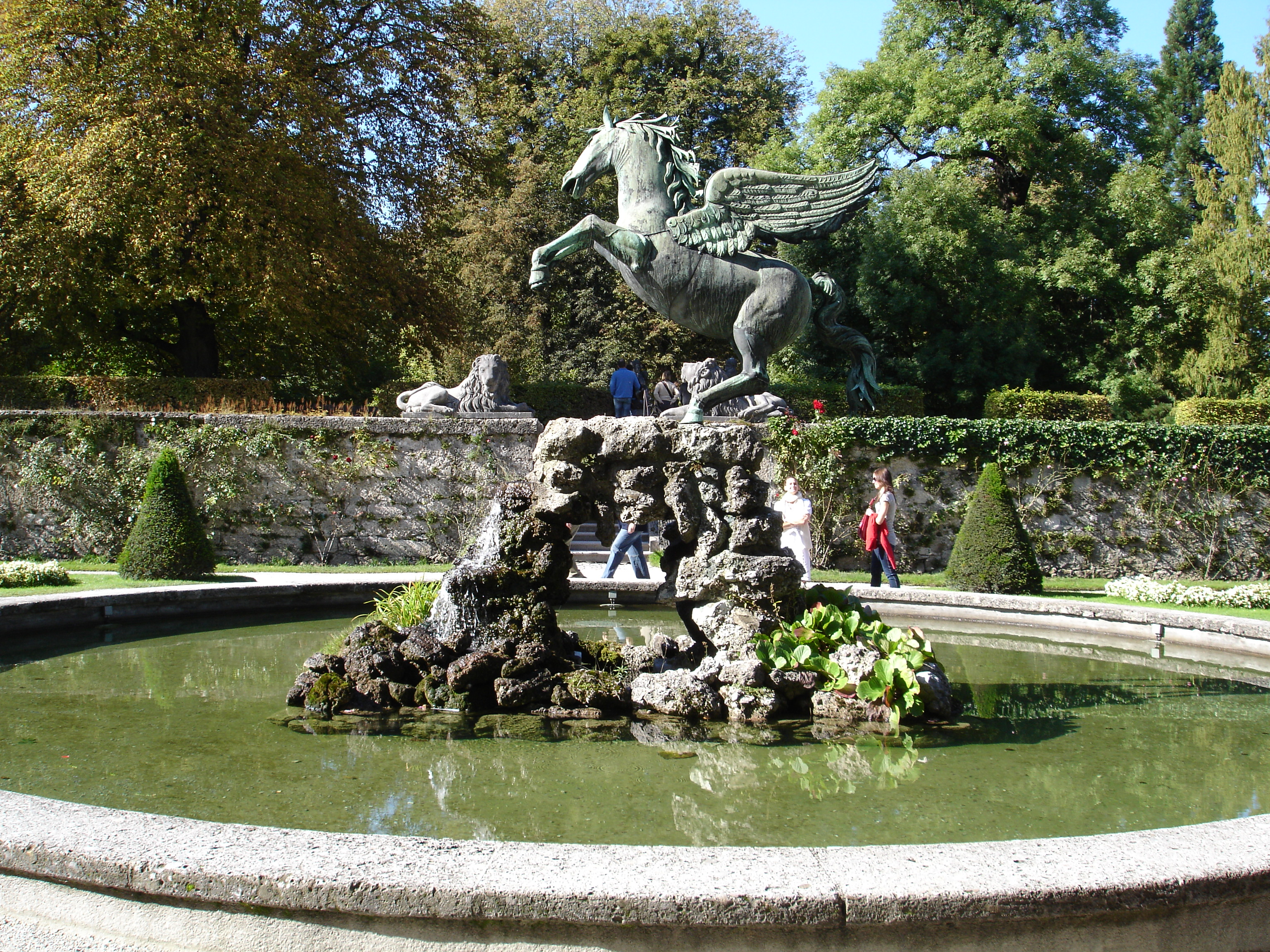
The famous fountain in Mirabell Gardens (seen in the "Do-Re-Me" song from The Sound of Music)

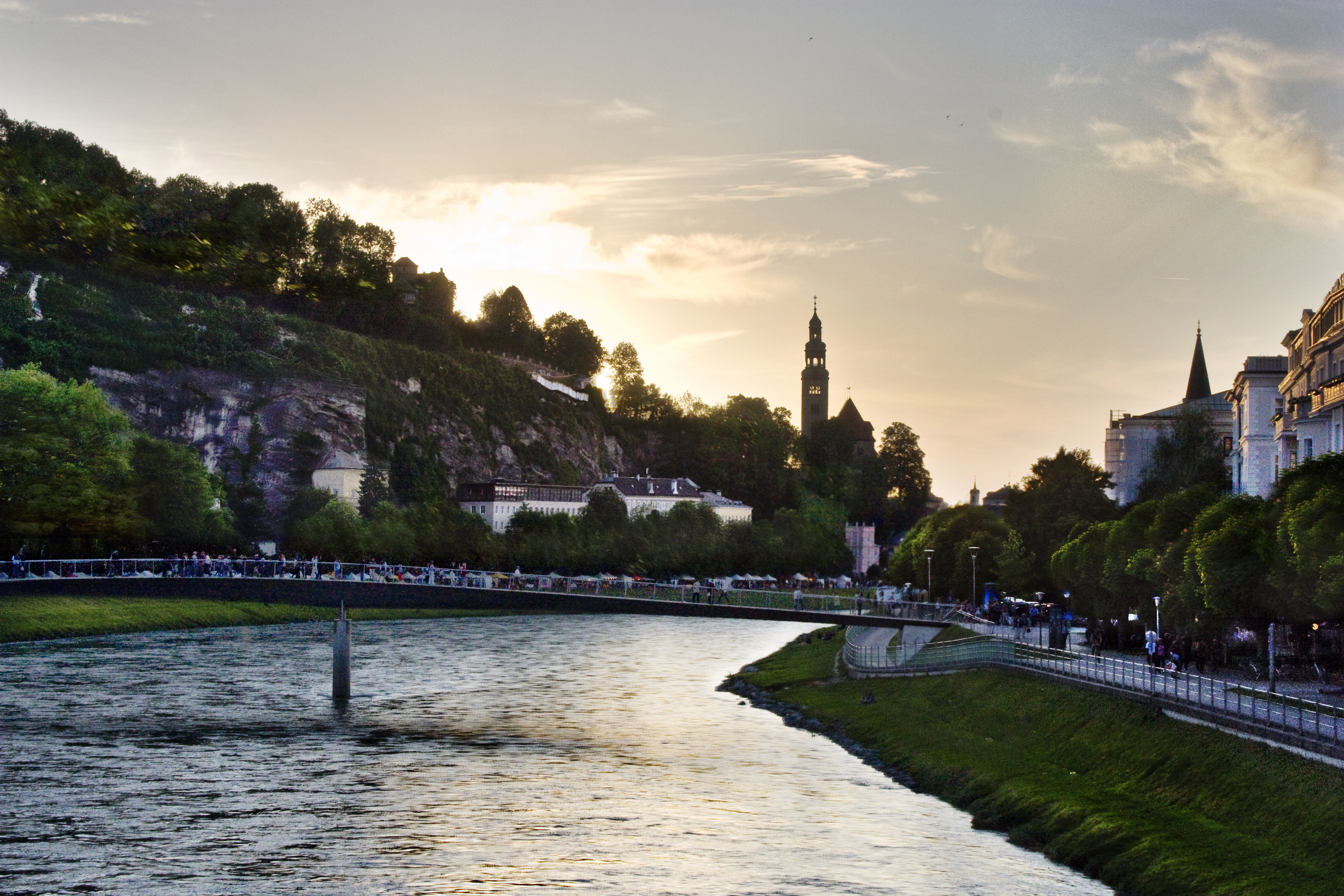
The Sunset at the Staatsbrücke

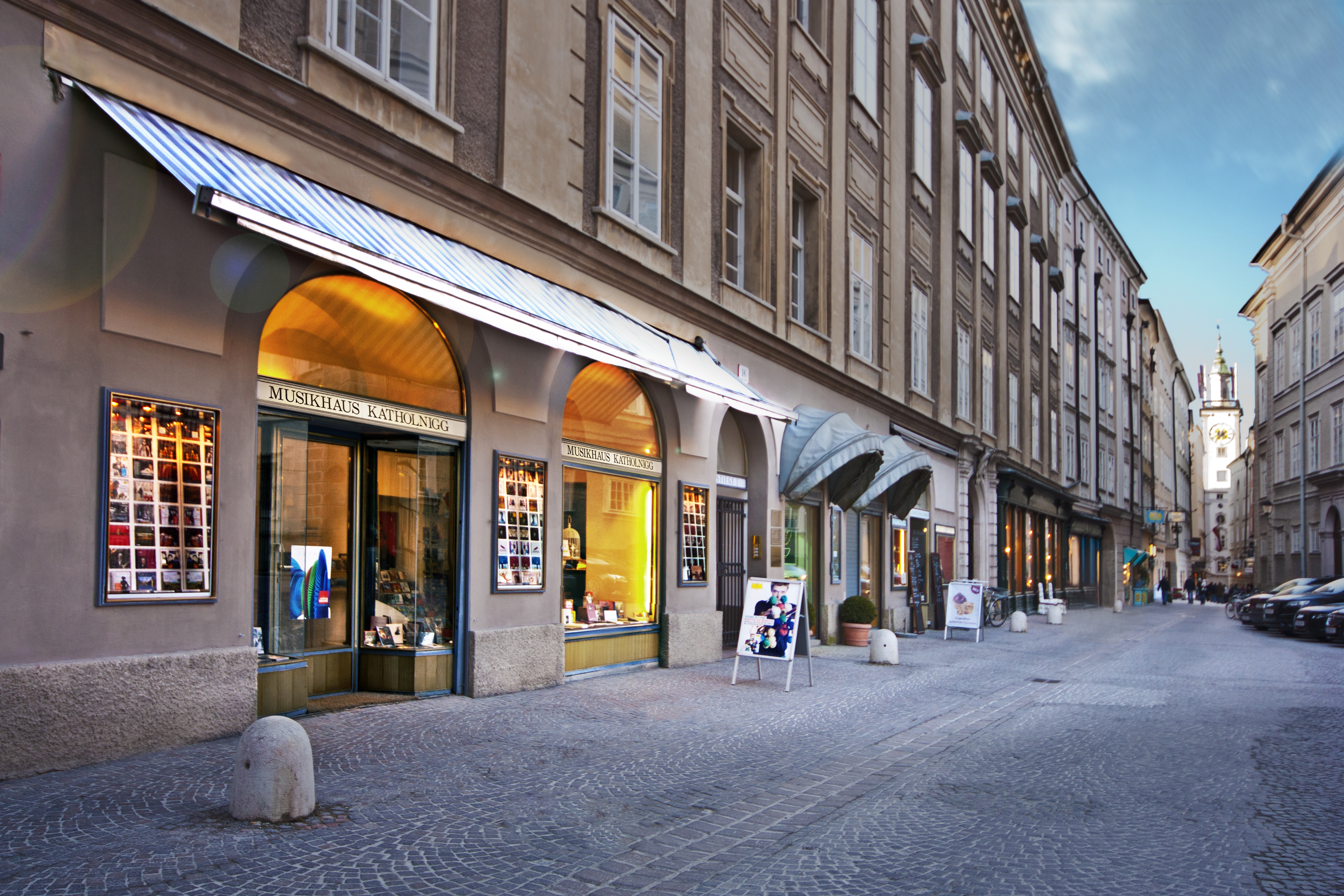
Sigmund Haffner Gasse – Rathaus

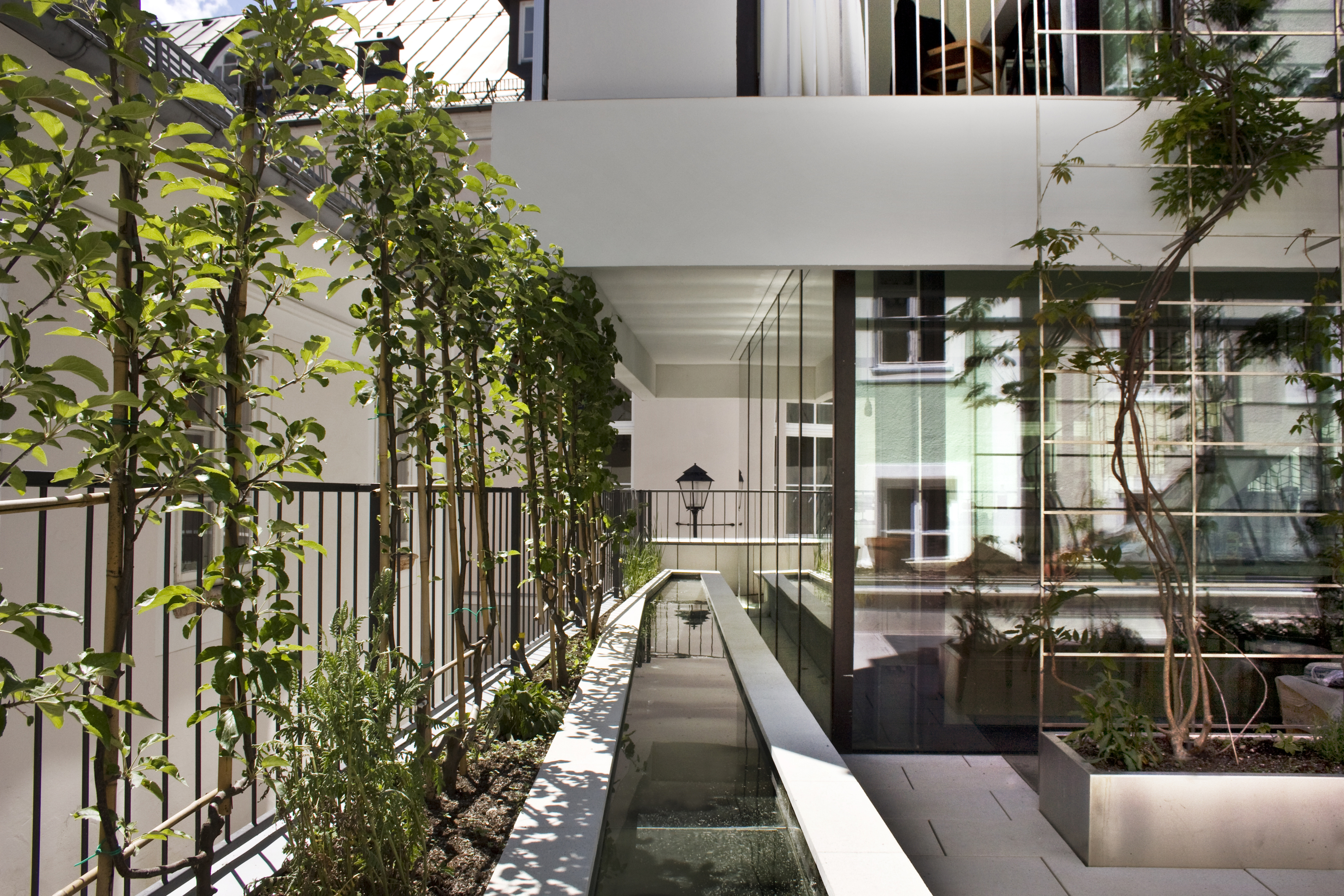
Residential and studio house Lechner in the old town

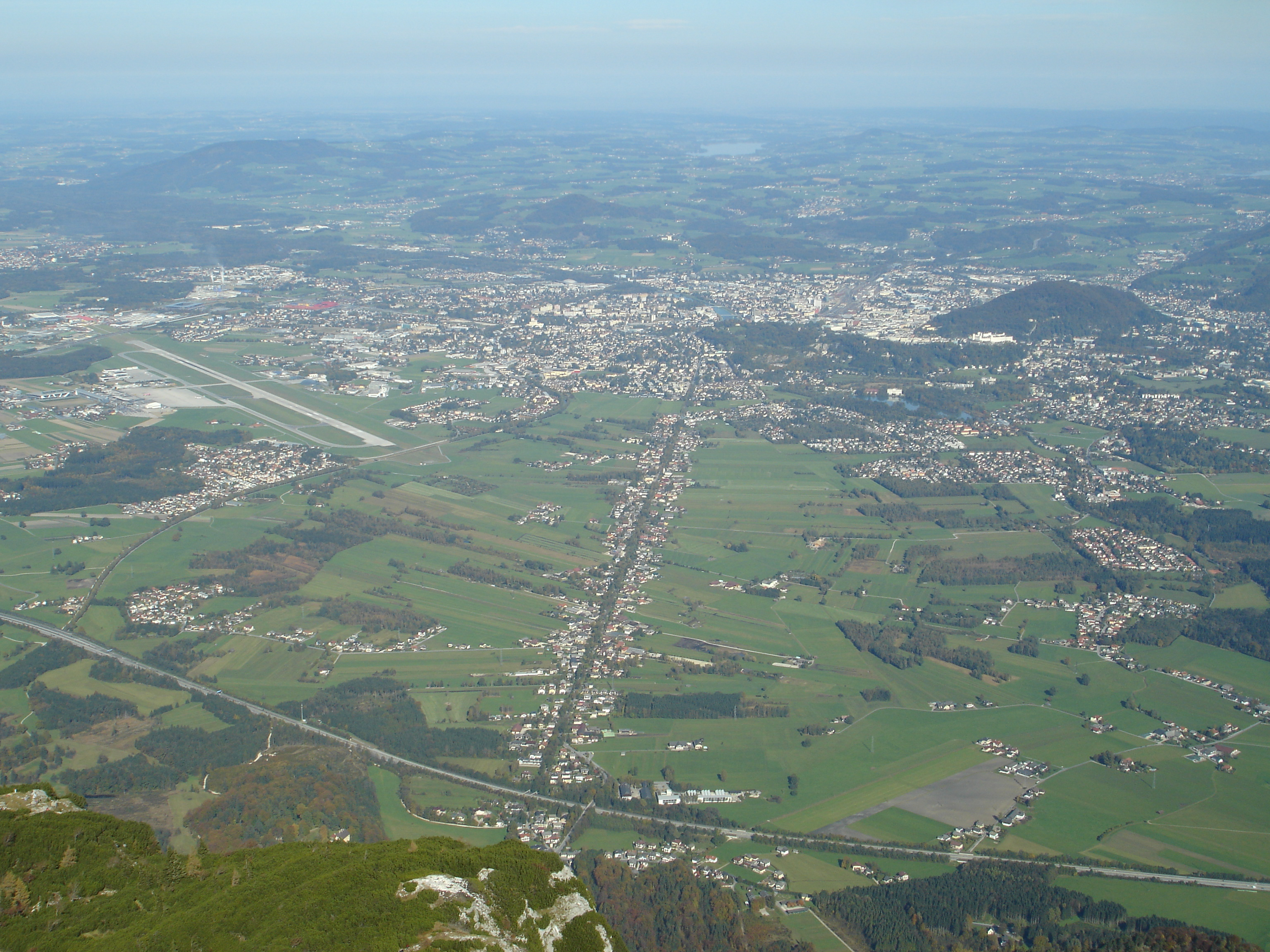
The Salzburg basin

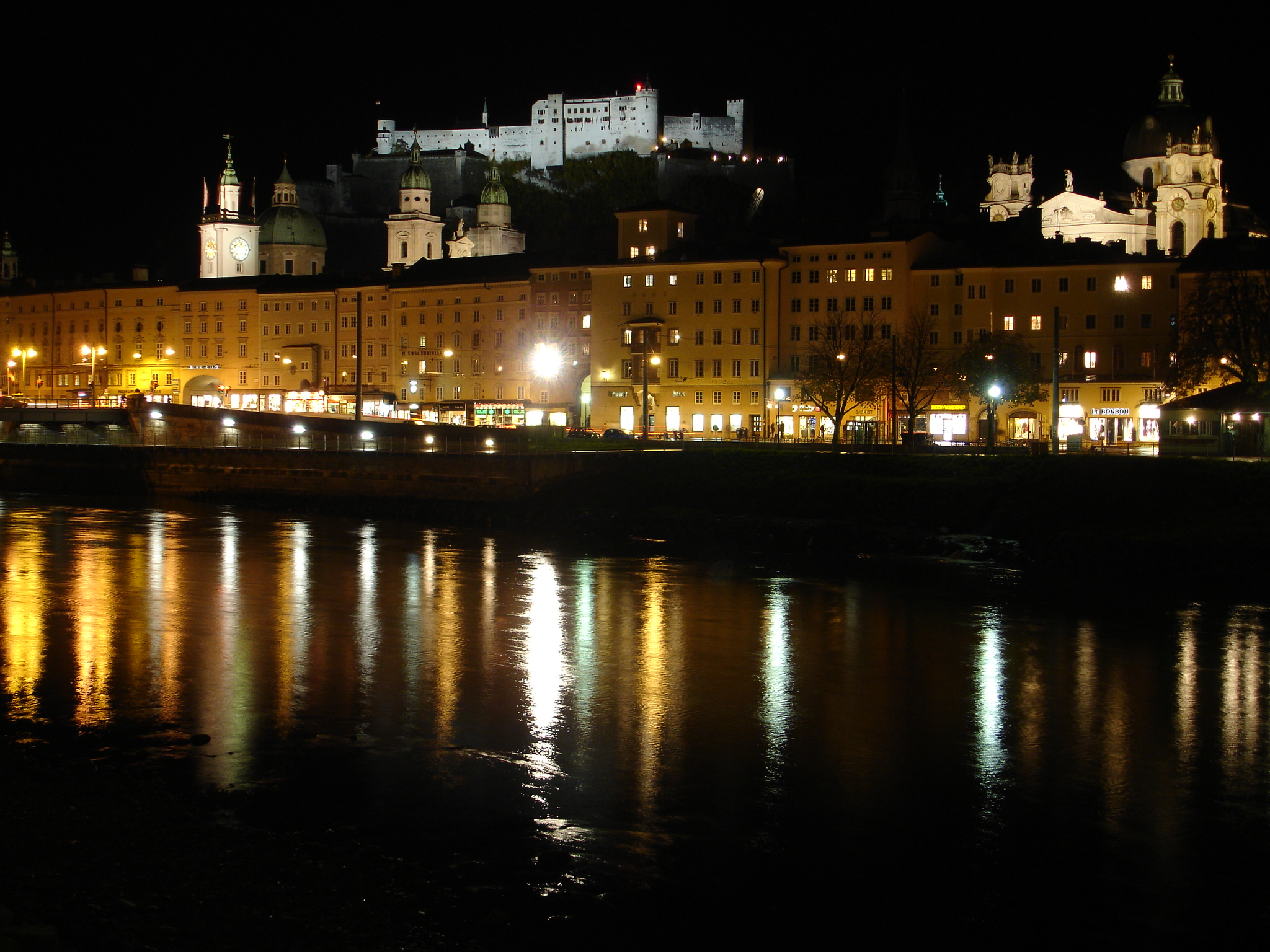
The fortress (background), Salzburg Cathedral (middle), and the Salzach (foreground)

ÖBB rail connection to Salzburg in Innsbruck

Mozart monument

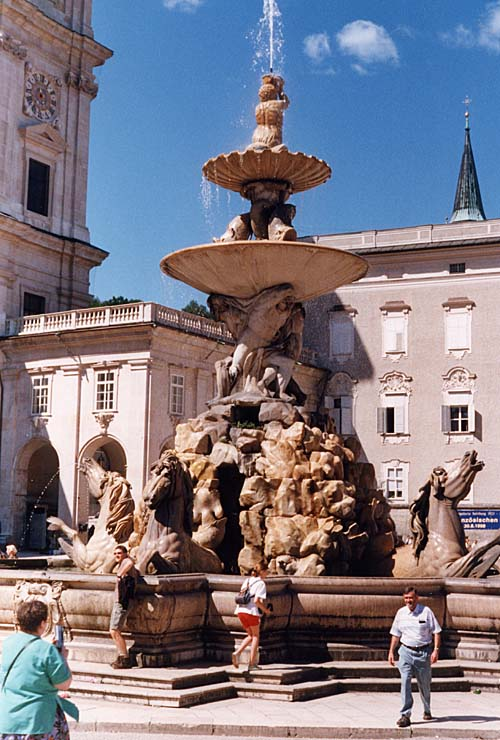
Fountain in the Residenzplatz

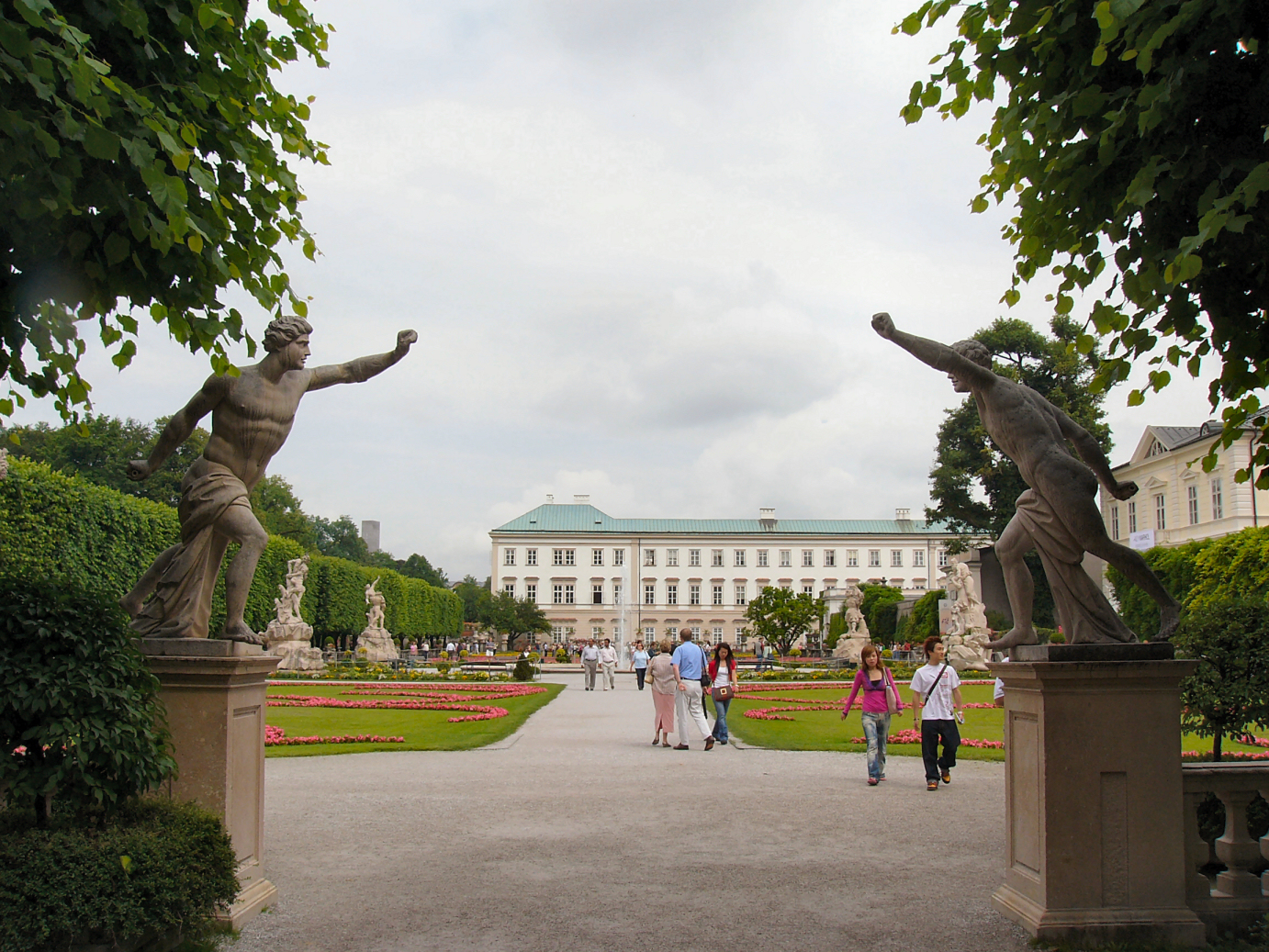
Palace of Mirabell

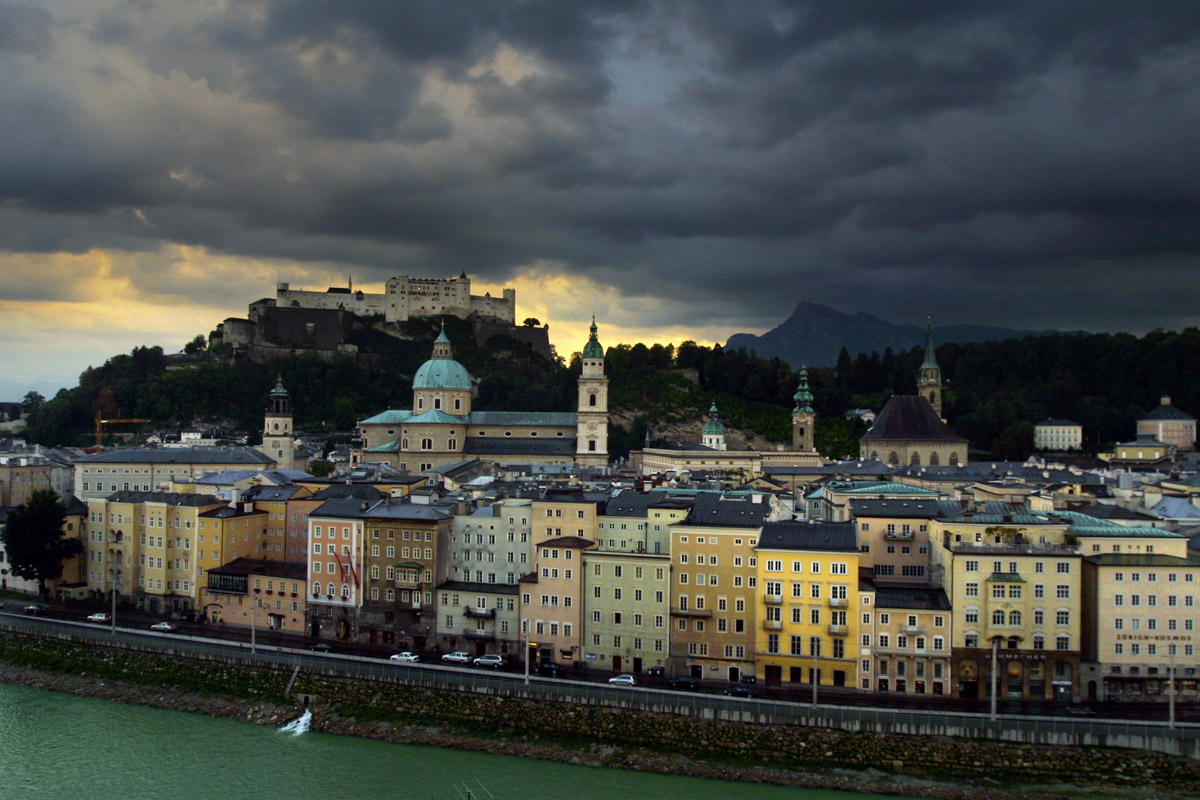
View of the old town and fortress, seen from Kapuzinerberg

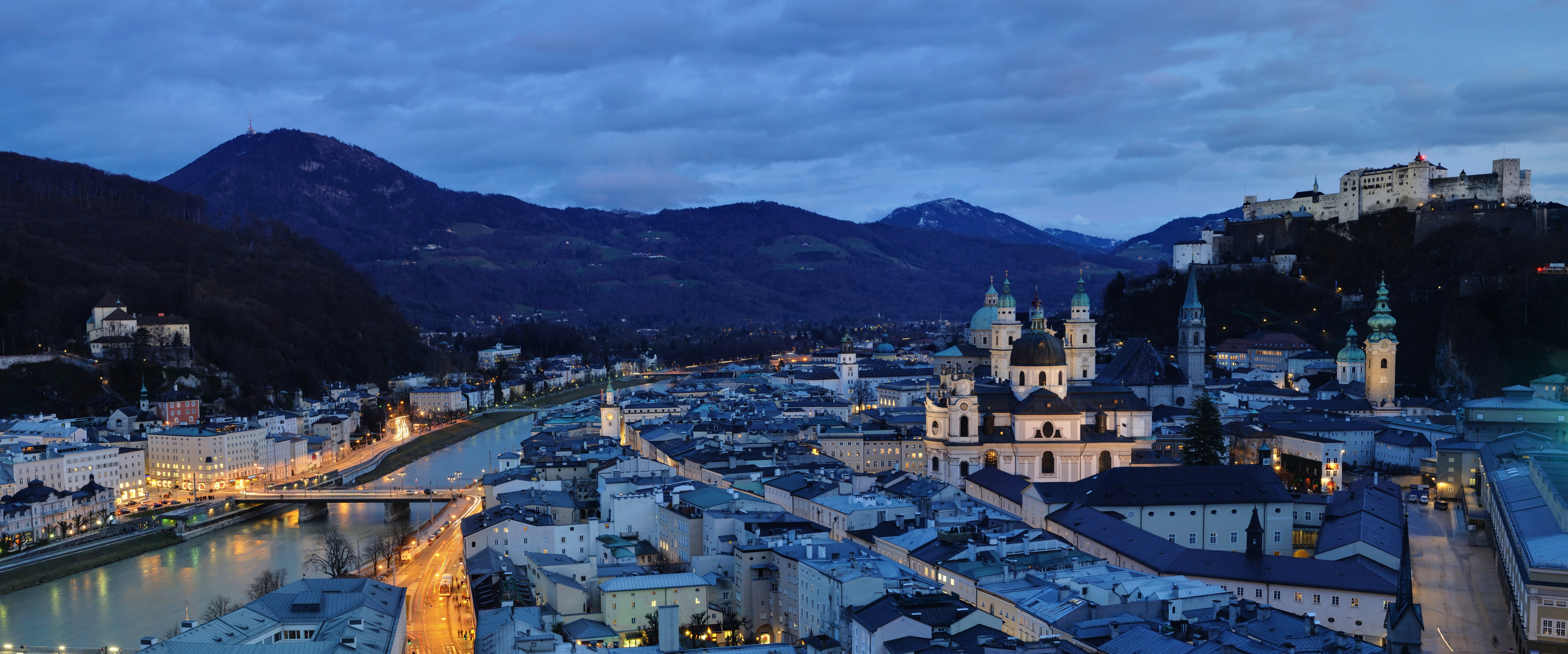
Salzburg at night

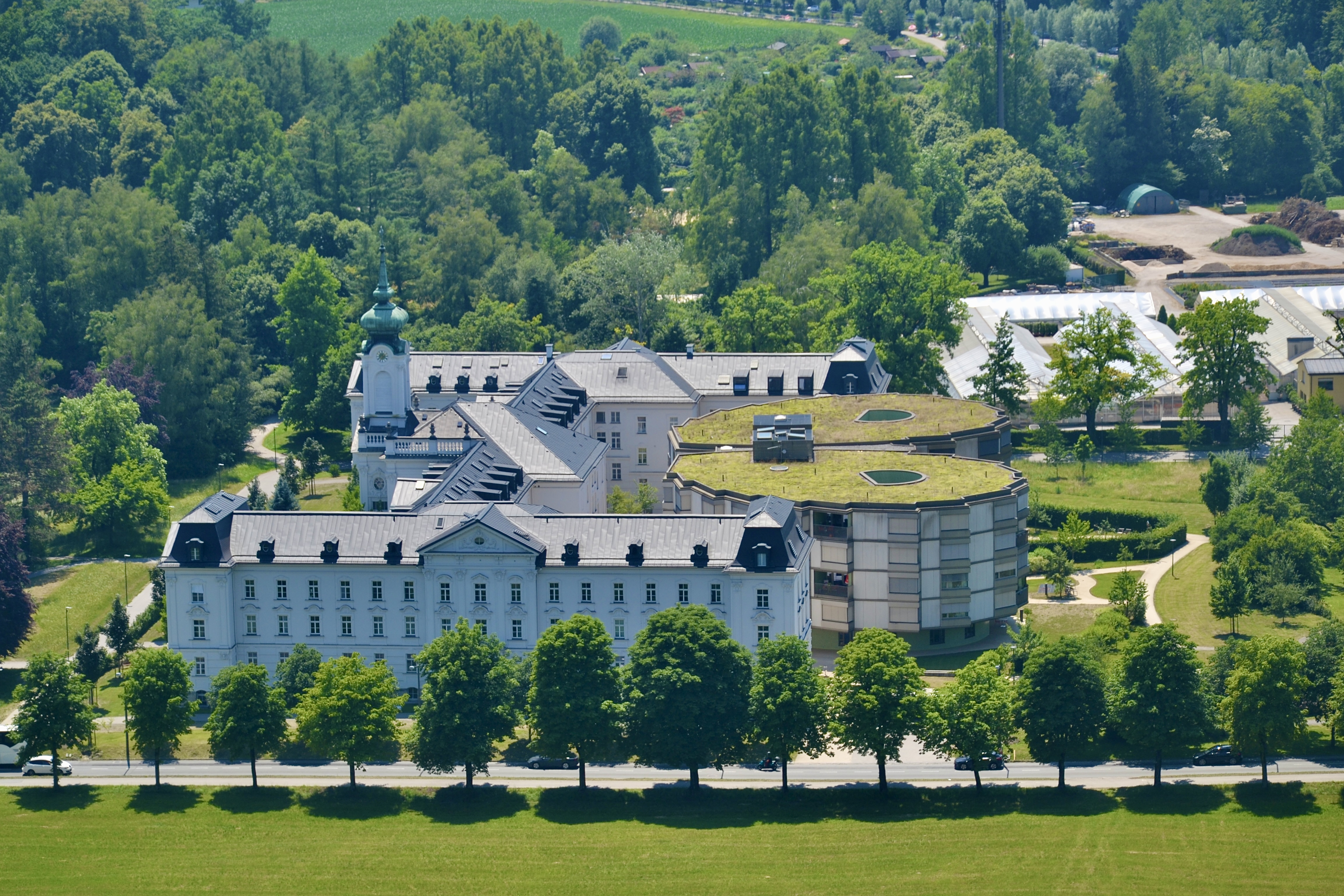
Senior citizen house in Salzburg, seen from Hohensalzburg castle
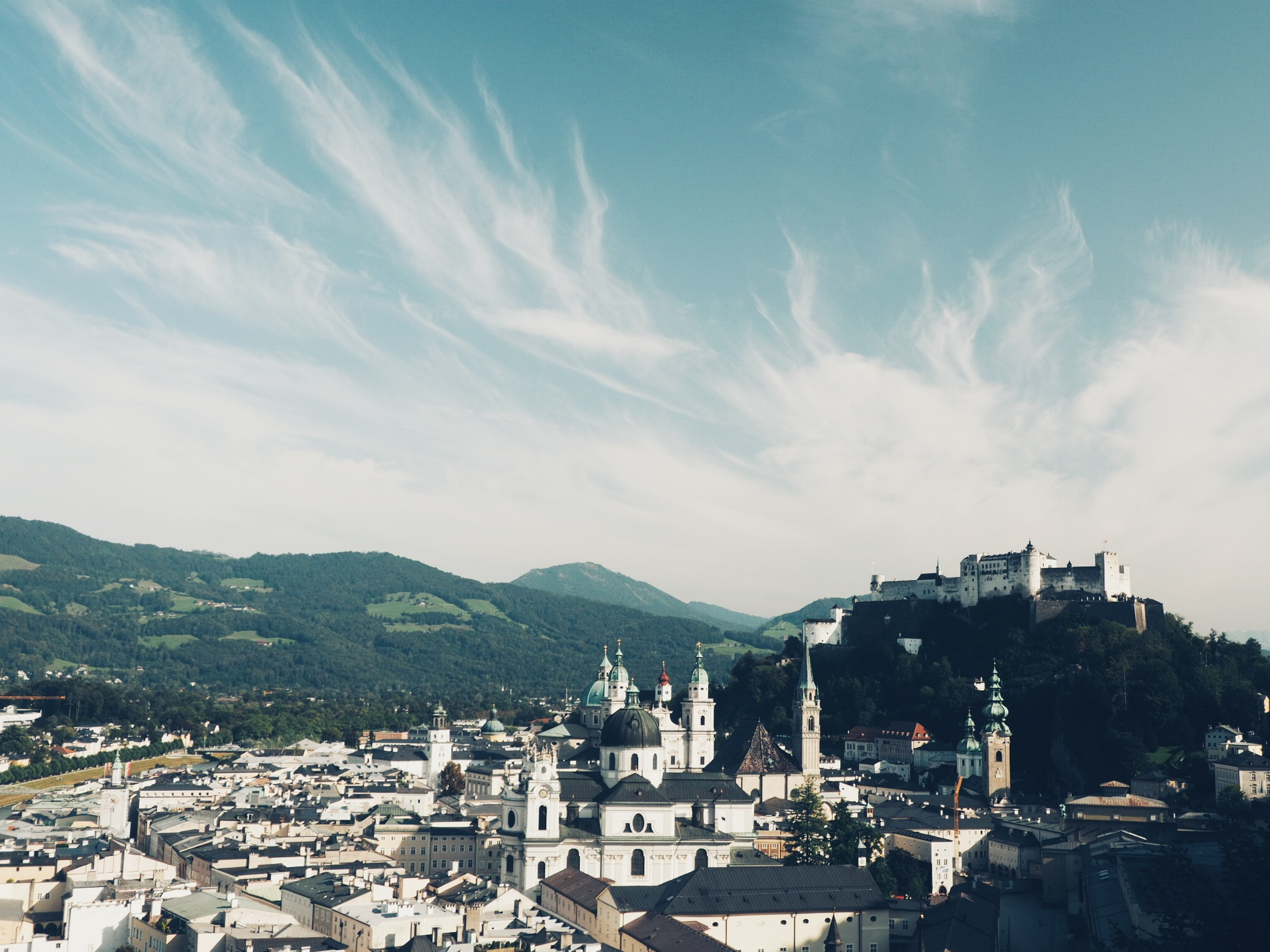
A view of the city centre of Salzburg with cirrus clouds in the sky
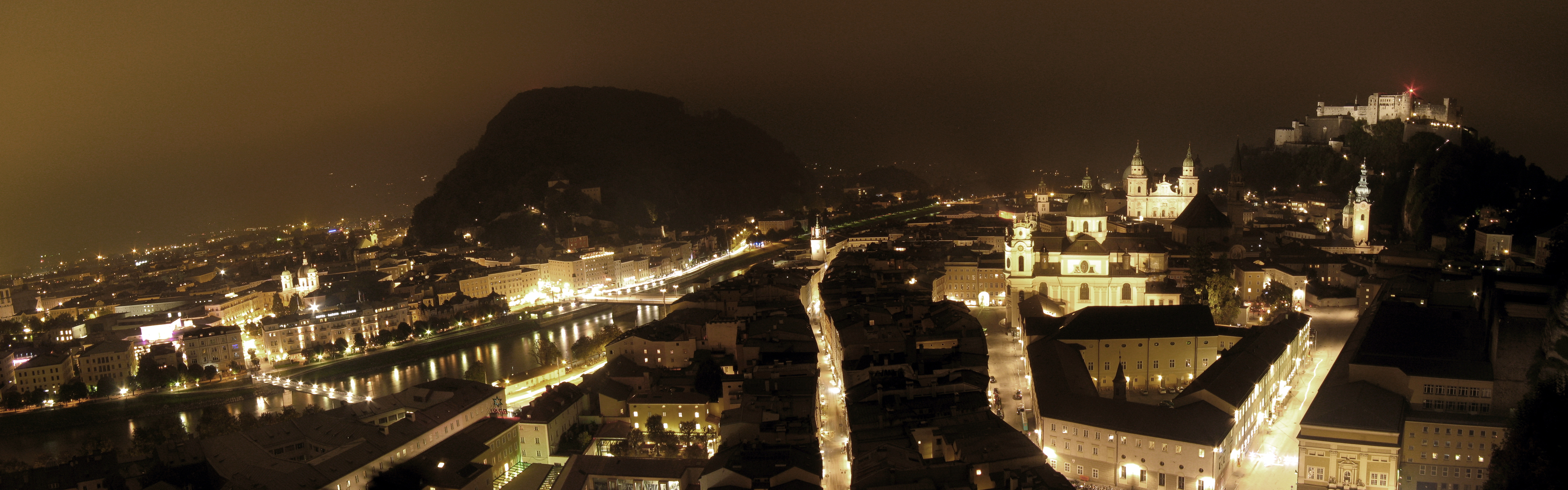
A night time long exposure of Salzburg
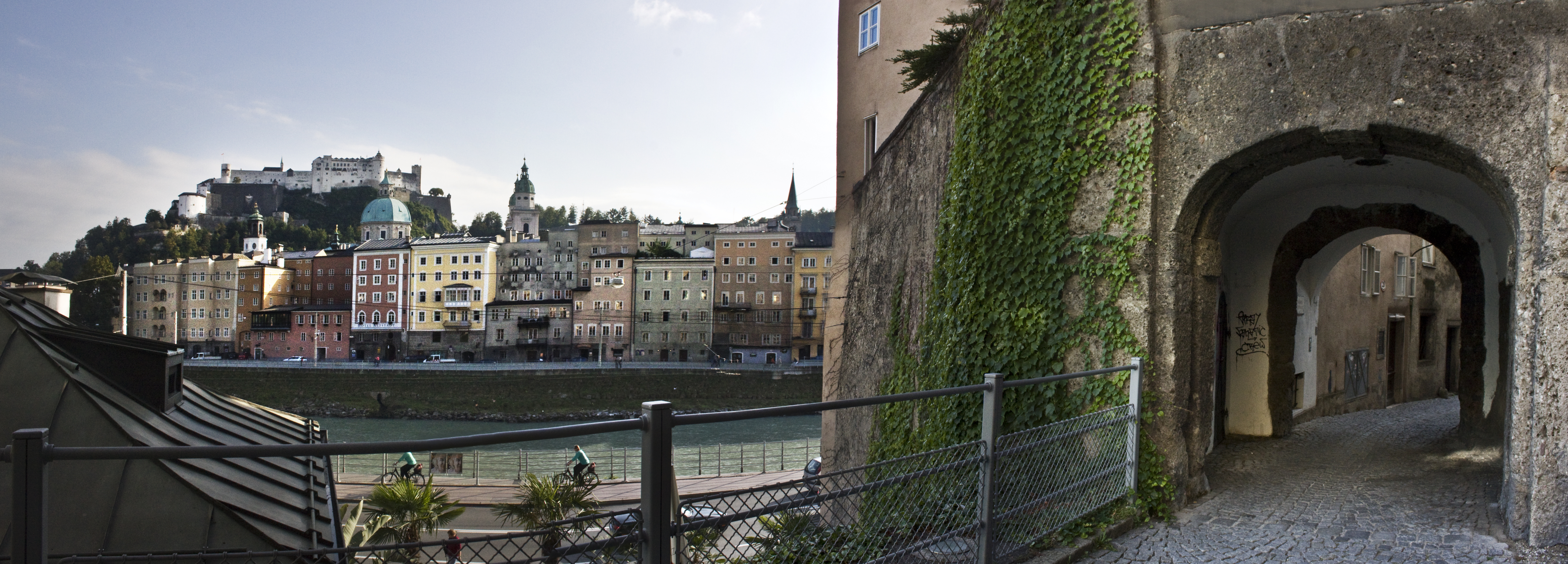
Salzburg old town with a typical narrow alleyway
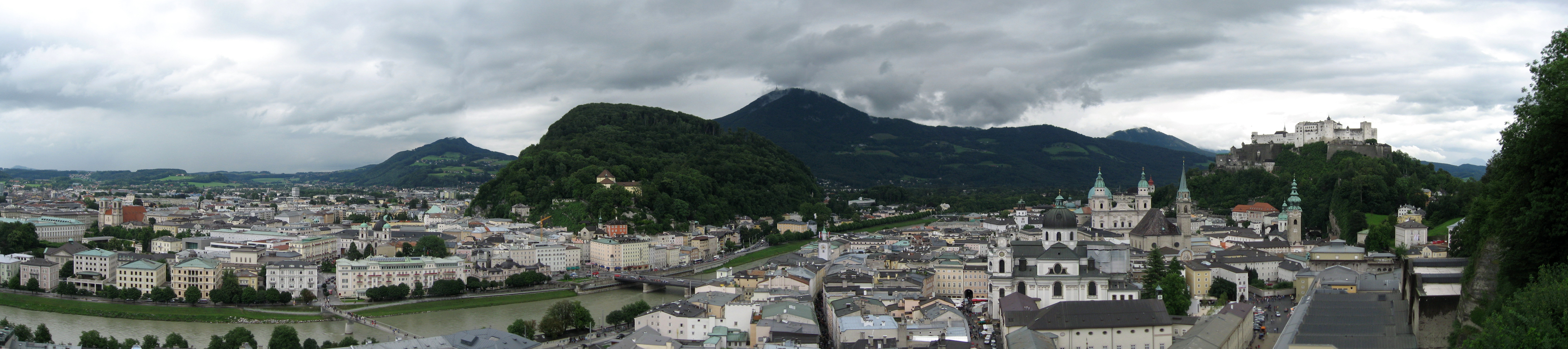
Salzburg Altstadt panorama
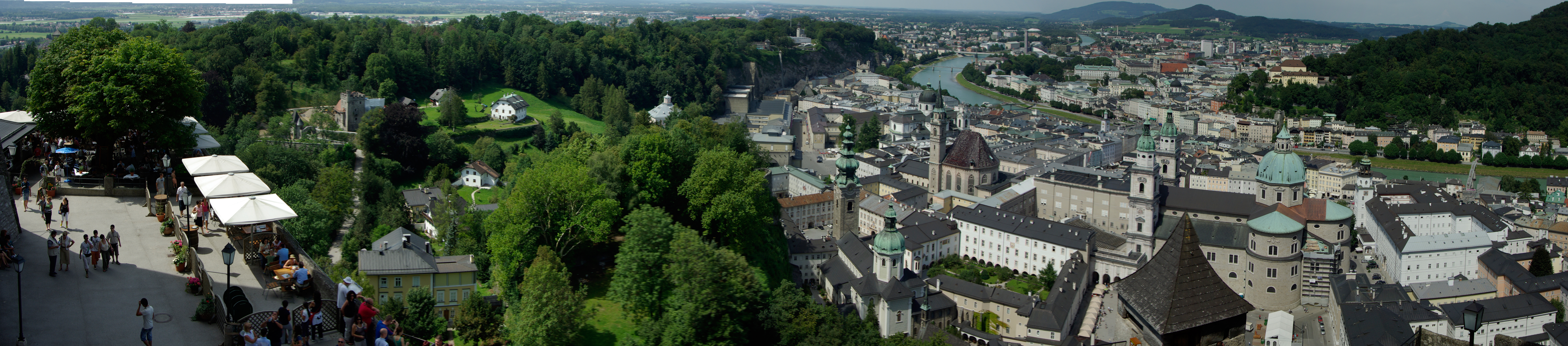
Salzburg panorama as seen from Hohensalzburg fortress

== See also ==
- List of World Heritage Sites in Austria
- Salzburg negotiations
