= Hotel Goldener Hirsch =

Hotel in Salzburg, Austria

Coordinates: 47°47′59″N 13°02′27″E

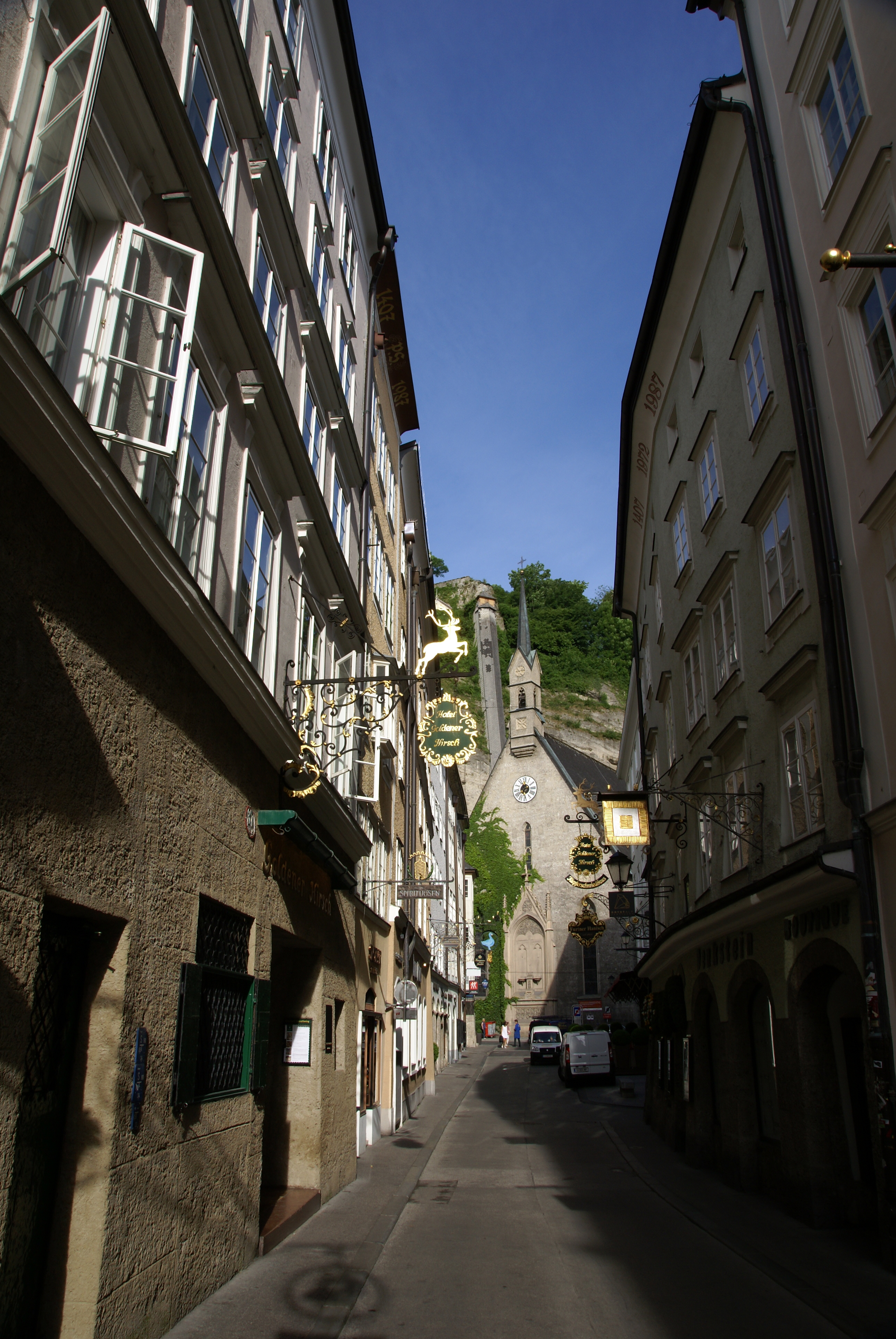
Hotel Goldener Hirsch (left) on Getreidegasse in Salzburg, Austria

The Hotel Goldener Hirsch is a five-star hotel located at Getreidegasse 37 in the Altstadt (old town) of Salzburg, Austria. The hotel includes the adjacent house at Getreidegasse 35 and the nearby goldsmith house at Getreidegasse 46. The Goldener Hirsch is listed as part of the UNESCO World Heritage Site Altstadt Salzburg.

== History ==
The first recorded documents referencing the building that now houses the Hotel Goldener Hirsch were found in Nonnberg Abbey and date back to 1407. The residents living at 256 Getreidegasse (the old numbering system, now 37) at the time were Heinrich von Hulczein and his wife Liebhart von Hall, Peter Erner von Mattsee, and silversmith Aezius Zehringer. Over the next two centuries, the house was inhabited by Liebhart von Haller (1434), Peter Erner von Mattsee (1438), silversmith Alex Sehringer (1442), fitter Bernhard Stockär (1453), locksmith Bartlmee Falk (1463) who enlarged the house, blacksmith Niklas Warislochner (1478–1501), widow Margareth Warislochner (1512), Heinrich Warislochner (1520), his cousin Ruprecht Thenn (1535), Georg Thenn (1547), and Friedrich Hormann (1562).

In 1596, Caspar Veichtner was listed as the first "host" of the first "hospitality business" at this address. After his widow married Sebastian Reittermann in 1628, the house was taken over by Georg Edlhofer in 1657. Paul Gschandtner was listed as the owner in 1671, the year the house was first called "Wirtshaus zum Goldener Hirschen" (Tavern of the golden deer). During the late seventeenth century and eighteenth century, the house was owned by Ludwig Gschandtner (1686), Franz Moshamer (1712), his son Franz Moshamer (1744), Maria Strasser, née Moshamer (1776), Herr von Enk (1795), and Andra Deckert (1798). In 1799, the house was called "Hirschlwirt".

In the nineteenth century, the guest house was owned by Wolfgang Deckert (1813), Franziska Deckert (1825), the son Wolfgang Deckert (1837) who opened a bar on Herbert-von-Karajan square, Georg Weickl (1859), Josef and Susanne Tischlinger (1861), Ludwig Ritter von Maffei (1872), and Karl Murauer (1882). Since 1859, the house has held a permanent trade license. In the early twentieth century, the property was owned by Joseph Schiller and Joseph Prantl (1919), Leo Landwekr and Carl Hart de Ruyter (1920), and finally Josepf Kozakovsky (1922).

The tourist industry in Salzburg was dramatically changed in August 1922 when the first complete Salzburg Festival was held featuring Richard Strauss conducting Wolfgang Amadeus Mozart's opera Don Giovanni, and Max Reinhardt's performance of Hugo von Hofmannsthal's Jedermann on the steps of Salzburg Cathedral. The festival brought in 560 million krones to the city's economy. In the next few years, an average of 43,000 tourists visiting the city during August (the festival month), compared to 24,000 in June and 20,000 in September. Room prices in the city varied significantly, with the Grand Hotel de l'Europe at the top end (charging 40 shillings) to the Goldener Hirsch (charging only eight shillings). In order to attract more upper class patrons, Kozakovsky began to renovate 70 rooms at the Goldener Hirsch, furnishing all rooms and one bathroom in the Biedermeier style, and installing telephones and heating.

In 1939, the hotel was sold to Count Emanuel von Walderdorff. In August 1940, hoteliers Franz and Anna Bernauer became new tenants of the Goldener Hirsch and ran the hotel during the war years. On 6 July 1946, Count Emanuel gained approval from the city's mayor to make alterations to the hotel. The Bernauers left around that time, and the count's wife, Countess Harriet von Walderdorff, took over the hotel with the goal of establishing the Goldener Hirsch as the top festival hotel. Renovations to the Goldener Hirsch began on 2 January 1947. Working with architect Otto Prossinger, Harriet began redesigning the hotel's interior with simple modern décor and created a country manor in the heart of Salzburg. She had decorated her own home at Hochegg am Gaisberg using inexpensive and comfortable country-style furniture and decor, and she wanted to reproduce that cozy style in the hotel. The Countess brought in typical Austrian furniture and antique artefacts, replacing the Persian rugs with traditional patchwork carpets. The hotel opened on 28 April 1948 with an unpretentious yet elegant style—modern comfort in traditional surroundings. It soon became a prototype for the design of countless other buildings in western Austria.

In 1970, the Goldener Hirsch property was sold to Carl Adolf Vogel, who acquired the adjacent Stockhamerbräu at Getreidegasse 35, thereby doubling the accommodation capacity of the hotel. The Stockhamerbräu also has a long history, dating back to 1407 when it was owned by Peter Haffter. In 1536, it was owned by brewer Martin Steuber, and by 1569 the house was called a Bräuhaus. The house stayed in the possession of the Stockhamer family for generations, and by 1680 Stockhamerbräu had become the third largest brewery in Salzburg. The brewery closed in 1865. On 25 April 1945, the house was damaged by a bomb attack.

Since autumn 1976, the Goldener Hirsch has belonged to the Imperial Hotels Austria AG and since 1998 has been able to draw upon the international network of the operating company Starwood Hotels & Resorts as part of its "The Luxury Collection" brand.

== Description ==
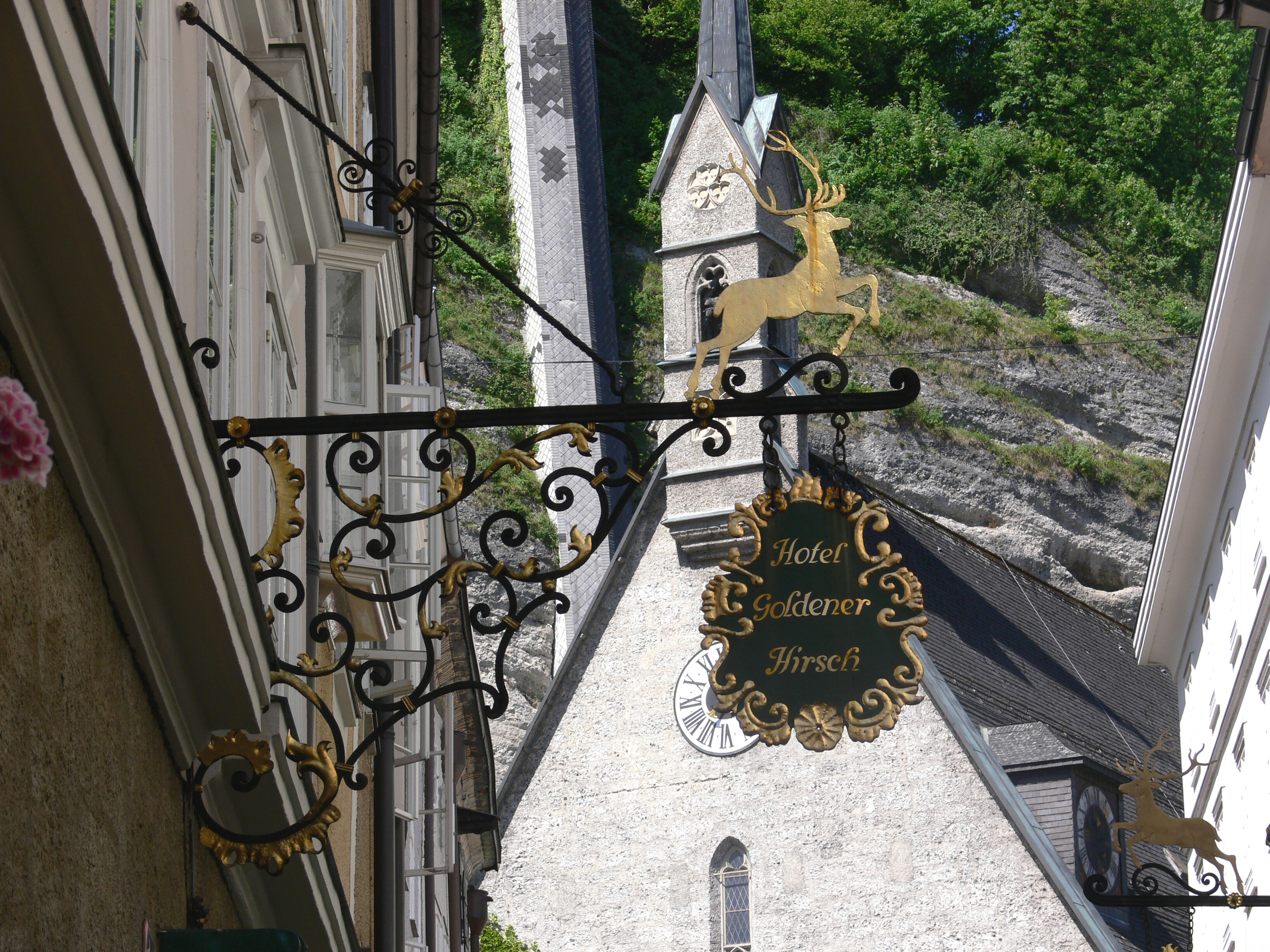
Hotel Goldener Hirsch door sign

The Hotel Goldener Hirsch is located at Getreidegasse 37 in the Altstadt (Old town) of Salzburg, near the Großes Festspielhaus (Great Festival Hall). The hotel includes the adjacent house at Getreidegasse 35 and the nearby goldsmith house at Getreidegasse 46. The hotel has a total of 70 rooms—65 guest rooms and five suites. There is a small reception area off of Getreidegasse 37. Just beyond, a central patio with glass ceilings serves as an informal bar and lounge. The formal Restaurant Goldener Hirsch is directly accessible from Herbert-von-Karajan-Square and the Festival Hall or via the main hotel entrance on the Getreidegasse. The less formal Restaurant s'Herzl, located in the former goldsmith shop at Getreidegasse 46, is decorated in the style of a fifteenth century Salzburg country inn. The restaurant serves authentic Austrian cuisine and local delicacies in a casual setting. The history of the Restaurant s'Herzl dates back to 1767, when the restaurant was a goldsmith shop.

== Guests ==
The Hotel Goldener Hirsch has had many famous guests over the years, including Julie Andrews, Ingrid Bergman, Leonard Bernstein, Klaus Maria Brandauer, Richard Burton, Jose Carreras, Richard Chamberlain, Claudette Colbert, Tony Curtis, Walt Disney, Plácido Domingo, Kirk Douglas, Douglas Fairbanks, Joan Fontaine, Clark Gable, Paulette Goddard, Herbert von Karajan, Ben Kingsley, Natassia Kinsky, Hedy Lamarr, Zubin Metha, Roger Moore, Ann-Sophie Mutter, Merle Oberon, Luciano Pavarotti, Maximilian Schell, Romy Schneider, Arnold Schwarzenegger, Nikolaus Harnoncourt, Sir Georg Solti, Leopold Stokowsky, and Elizabeth Taylor.

== Gallery ==
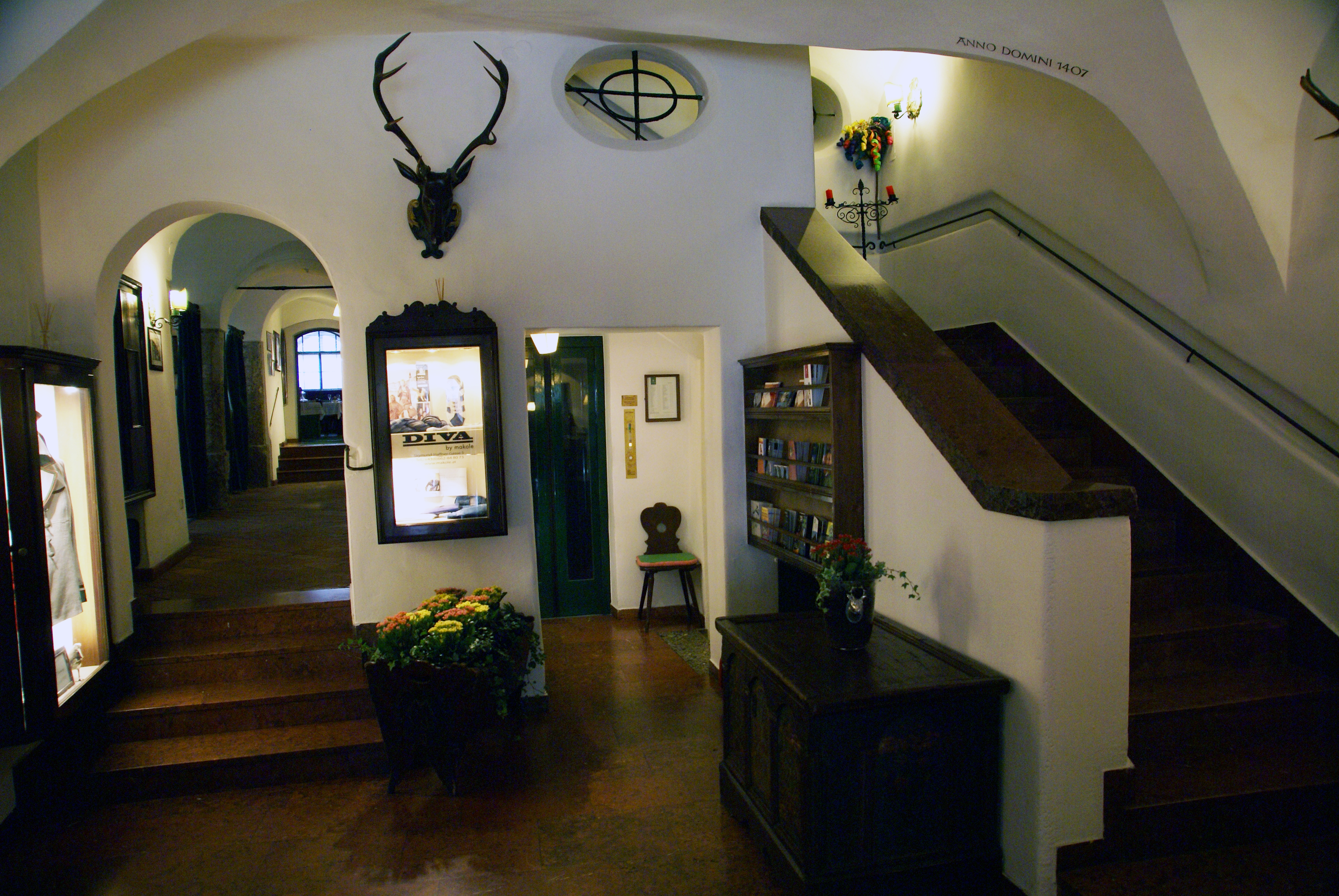
Lobby

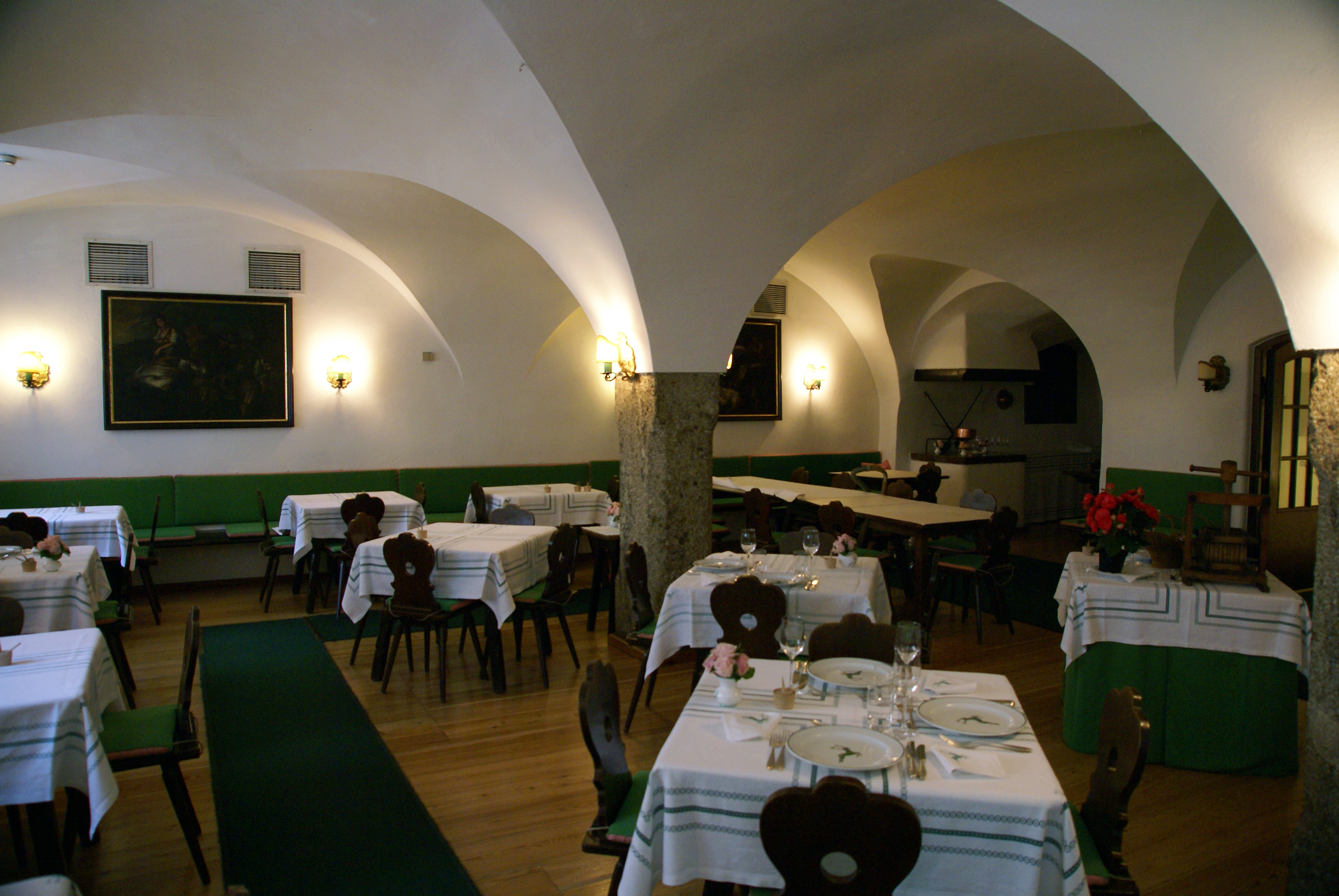
Restaurant

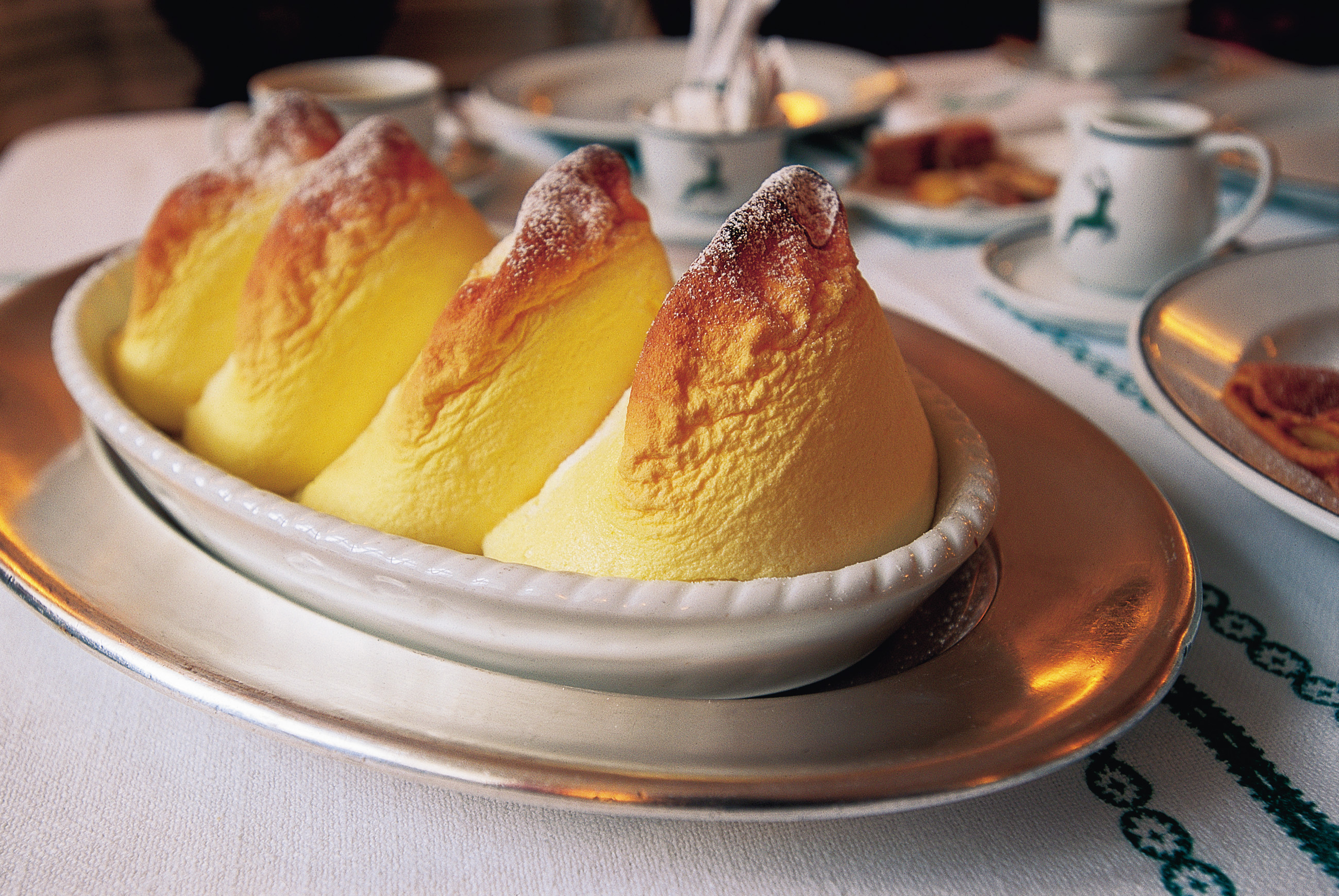
Salzburger Nockerl, served at the restaurant

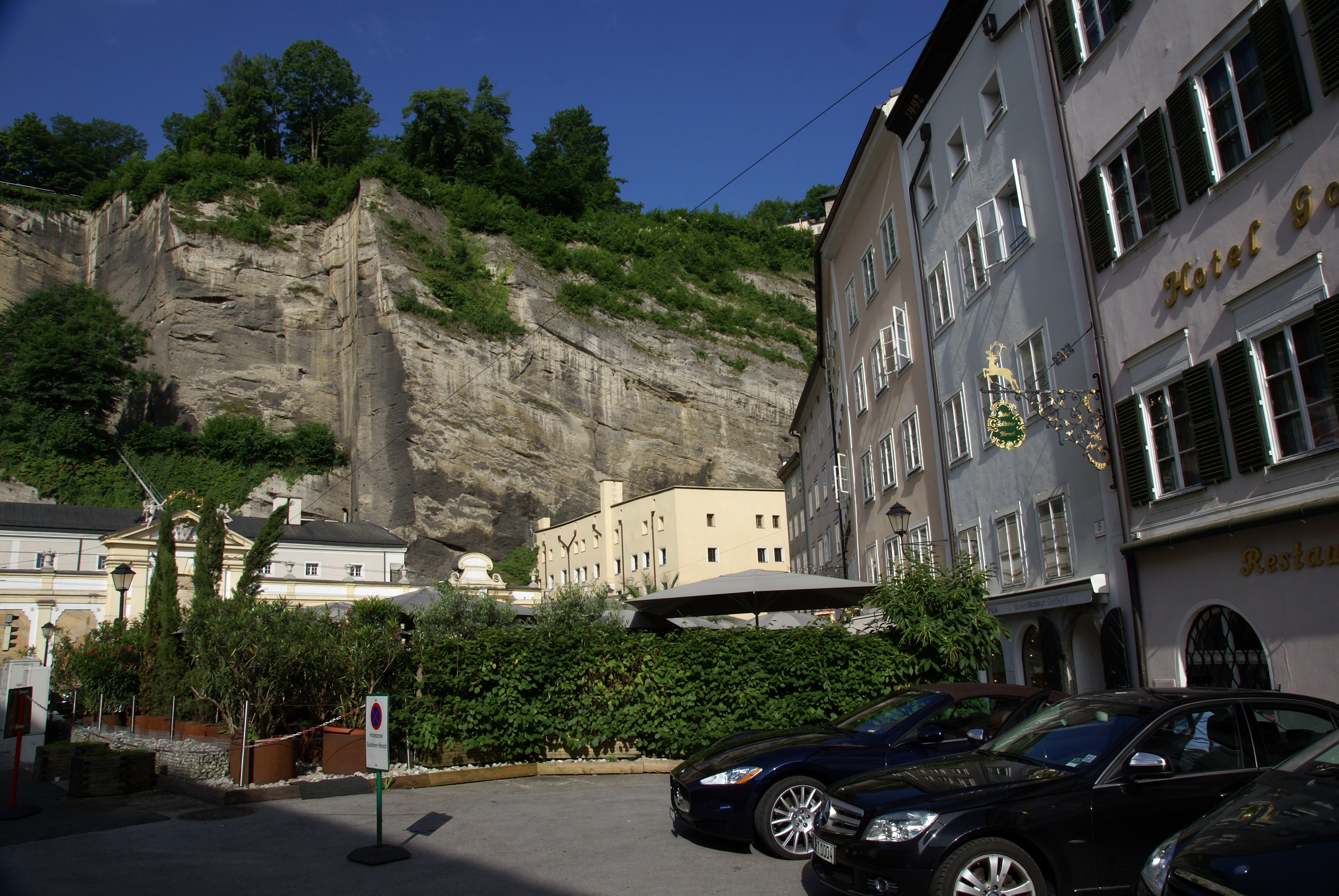
Herbert-von-Karajan-Platz entrance (right)
