= Getreidegasse =

Street in Salzburg, Austria

Coordinates: 47°48′00″N 13°02′38″E

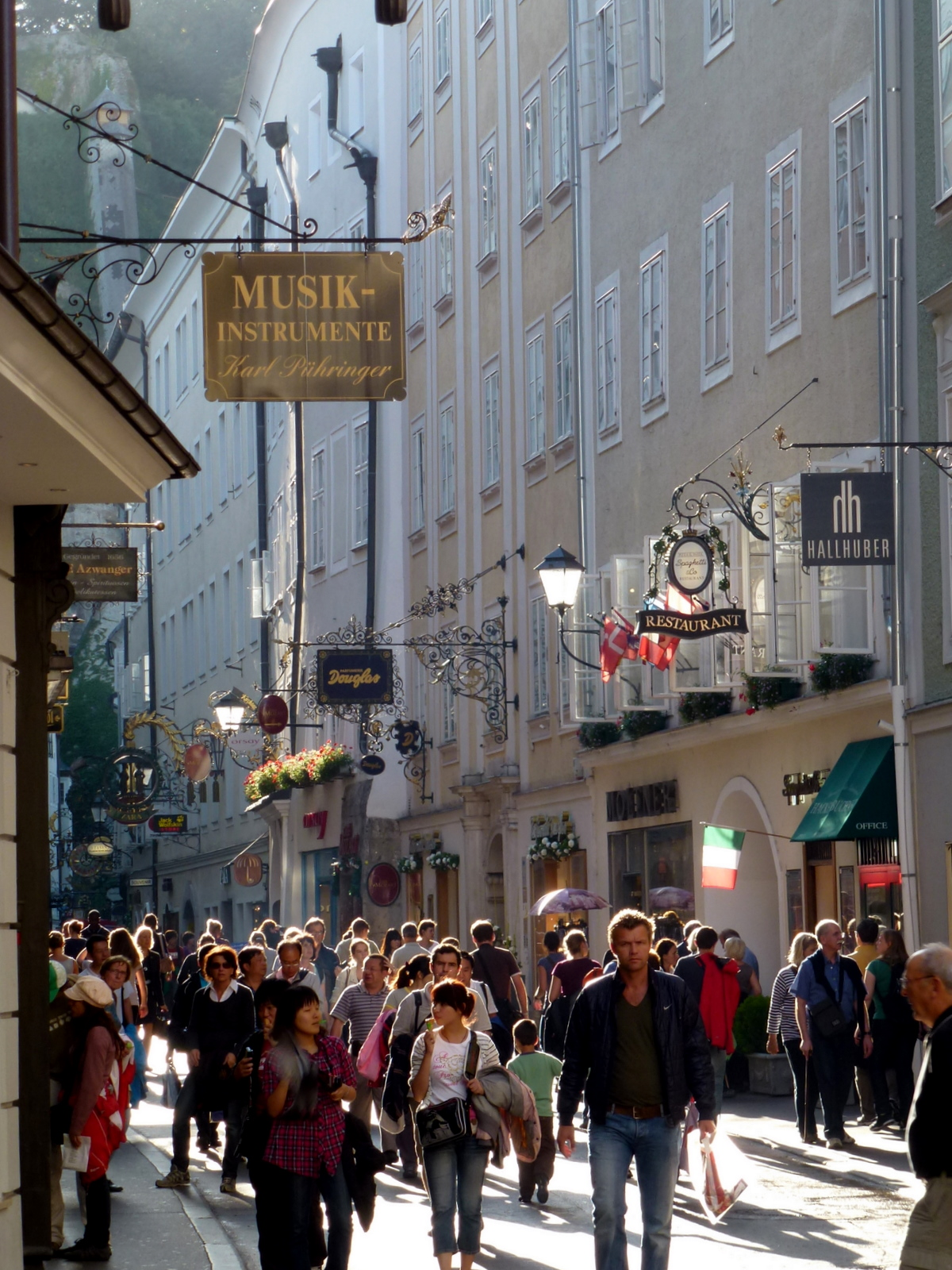
Getreidegasse on a summer afternoon

Getreidegasse ("Grain Lane") is a busy shopping street in the historic Altstadt (Old Town) of Salzburg, Austria, a UNESCO World Heritage Site since 1996. It is known for the birthplace of Wolfgang Amadeus Mozart at No. 9, where he lived until the age of 17. The narrow street is characterised by numerous high townhouses side by side with its wrought iron guild signs.

== Overview ==
Getreidegasse runs parallel to, but one block back from, the Salzach river and today is part of a large pedestrian zone in the Old Town quarter. First mentioned as Trabegasse (derived from traben 'to trot') about 1150, when it led from the historic Salzburg trade centre to the northwestern suburb of Mülln, its name was changed several times before it became the Getreidegasse. The citizens received staple rights by the prince-archbishops in the 14th century, whereafter several large trading houses began to display their goods along the road. Subsequently, Getreidegasse became a favoured residential area for Salzburg patricians and public officials. Many buildings contain picturesque passageways and courtyards.

A large number of the historic residential houses have been turned into commercial premises in recent decades. While Getreidegasse is one of the city's most popular tourist attractions, several attempts have been made by the Salzburg city administration to retain the street's authentic character.

Every day, you saw the famous "puppet woman" (Marionettenfrau) with her brown basket on this street who sold puppets there from 1985-2019.

== Notable residents ==
- August Bebel (1840–1913), politician, worked as an apprentice in a woodturner's workshop on No. 3 from 1859 to 1860
- Wolfgang Amadeus Mozart (1756-1791). Mozart's birthplace at No. 9 was the home of his parents Leopold and Anna Maria Mozart since their marriage in 1747. His sister Maria Anna (Nannerl) was also born here; the family moved to nearby Hannibalplatz (present-day Makartplatz) in 1773. The International Mozarteum Foundation has operated a Mozart museum in the building since 1880.
- Adrian Ludwig Richter (1803–1884), painter, stayed on No. 21 in summer 1823
- Salome Alt (1568–1633), mistress to Prince-Archbishop Wolf Dietrich Raitenau, was documented as owner of a brewery house on No. 33 about 1620
