= Kleines Theater, Salzburg =

Coordinates: 47°48′26″N 13°3′39″E

Kleines Theater is a small theatre in Salzburg, Austria, dedicated to "Kleinkunst" (in German). The theatre was founded in 1984 as "Das Kleine Theater Schallmoos", headed by Claus Tröger. The theatre, located on Hauptstrasse 50, at the foot of the Kapuzinerberg hill can accommodate up to 150 (some sources say 180) people. A second venue called Theater Metropolis was built but had to be closed after a bankruptcy in 1999. Ferdinand L. Jansky took over in 2000 with a volunteer leadership of the theatre. It showcases contemporary theatre and cabaret. Theatre for children and youth is regularly performed at the venue, in collaboration with kindergartens and schools.
