= Franciscan Church, Salzburg =

Church in Salzburg, Austria

Franciscan Church
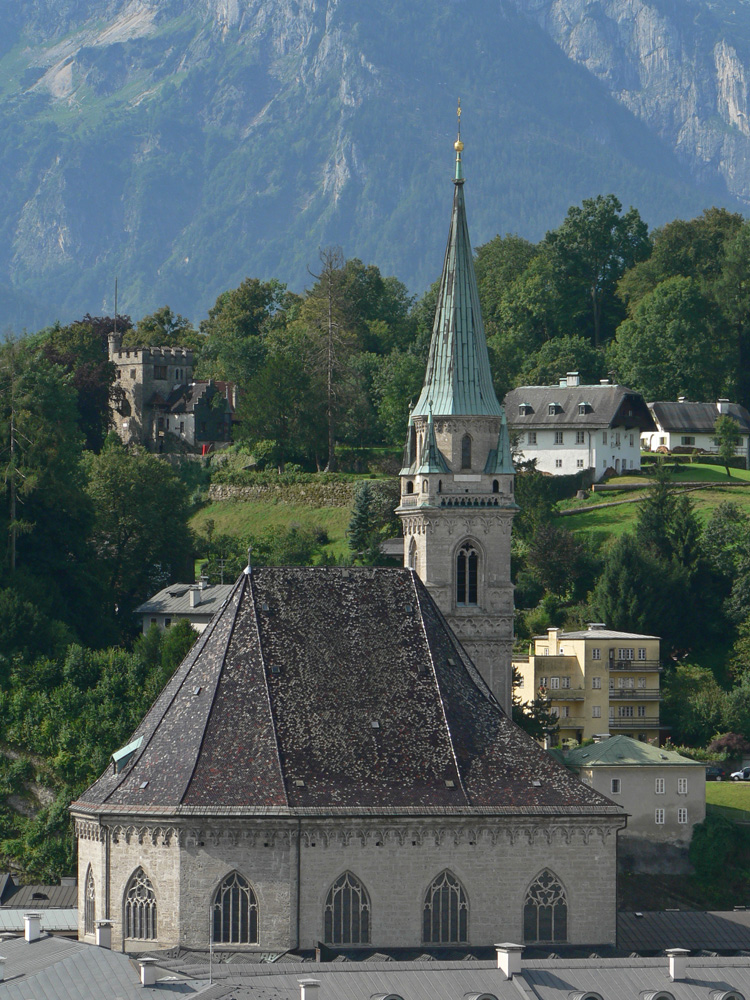

- Location within Austria

Religion
- Affiliation: Catholic Church
- Ecclesiastical or organisational status: Church
- Status: Active

Location
- Location: Salzburg, Austria
- State: Salzburg
- Coordinates: 47°47′53″N 13°02′39″E

Architecture
- Architect: Johann Bernhard Fischer von Erlach (altars)
- Type: Church
- Style: Gothic
- Groundbreaking: Eighth century
- Completed: 1498
- Spire: 1

Website
- http://www.franziskanerkirche-salzburg.at/

The Franciscan Church (German: Franziskanerkirche) is one of the oldest churches in Salzburg, Austria. The church is located at the intersection of Franziskanergasse and Sigmund-Haffner-Gasse opposite the Franciscan Friary in the Altstadt section of the city. The first church on this site was erected in the eighth century. Between 1408 and 1450, a Gothic choir replaced the Romanesque choir. A slender Gothic tower was added between 1468 and 1498. The church was dedicated to the Virgin Mary and served as the parish church until 1635. It was ceded to the Franciscan Order in 1642. Johann Bernhard Fischer von Erlach redesigned the church interior in the baroque style in the eighteenth century.

== History ==
The first church on this site was built in the eighth century during the time of Saint Virgil, who may have used it for baptisms. A document from 1139 mentions a parish church on this site. That church was destroyed by fire in 1167, together with five other churches, including the Dom. In the early thirteenth century (starting in 1208), the central nave of the church was built in the late-Romanesque style, making it among the oldest buildings in Salzburg. It was consecrated in 1221.

Between 1408 and 1450 Master Hans von Burghausen began work on the radiant Gothic choir to replace the Romanesque choir, which Stefan Krumenauer completed. A slender Gothic tower was added between 1468 and 1498. The church was dedicated to the Virgin Mary and served as the parish church until 1635. In 1670, archbishop Max Gandolf of Kuenburg ordered the top of the church's tower removed because it was taller than the cathedral tower. The tower was later restored in 1866 in the neo-Gothic style by Joseph Wessiken. In the eighteenth century, the church interior was redesigned in the baroque style. The "Rosary" of chapels behind the high altar date from the sixteenth century.

== Description ==
The church choir contains nine chapels decorated in baroque style by Johann Bernhard Fischer von Erlach in the eighteenth century. The chapel behind the high altar has a winged marble altar that dates from 1561. The High Altar (1709) by Fischer von Erlach is made of red marble and gold. The central Madonna statue on the winged altar dates from the Late Gothic period (1495-1498) and was sculpted by Michael Pacher of Tyrol. The staircase of the pulpit contains a marble lion from the 12th century standing over a man with a painful grimace on his face, pushing his sword into the belly of the lion. The triumphal arch holds frescoes by Conrad Laib.

== Gallery ==
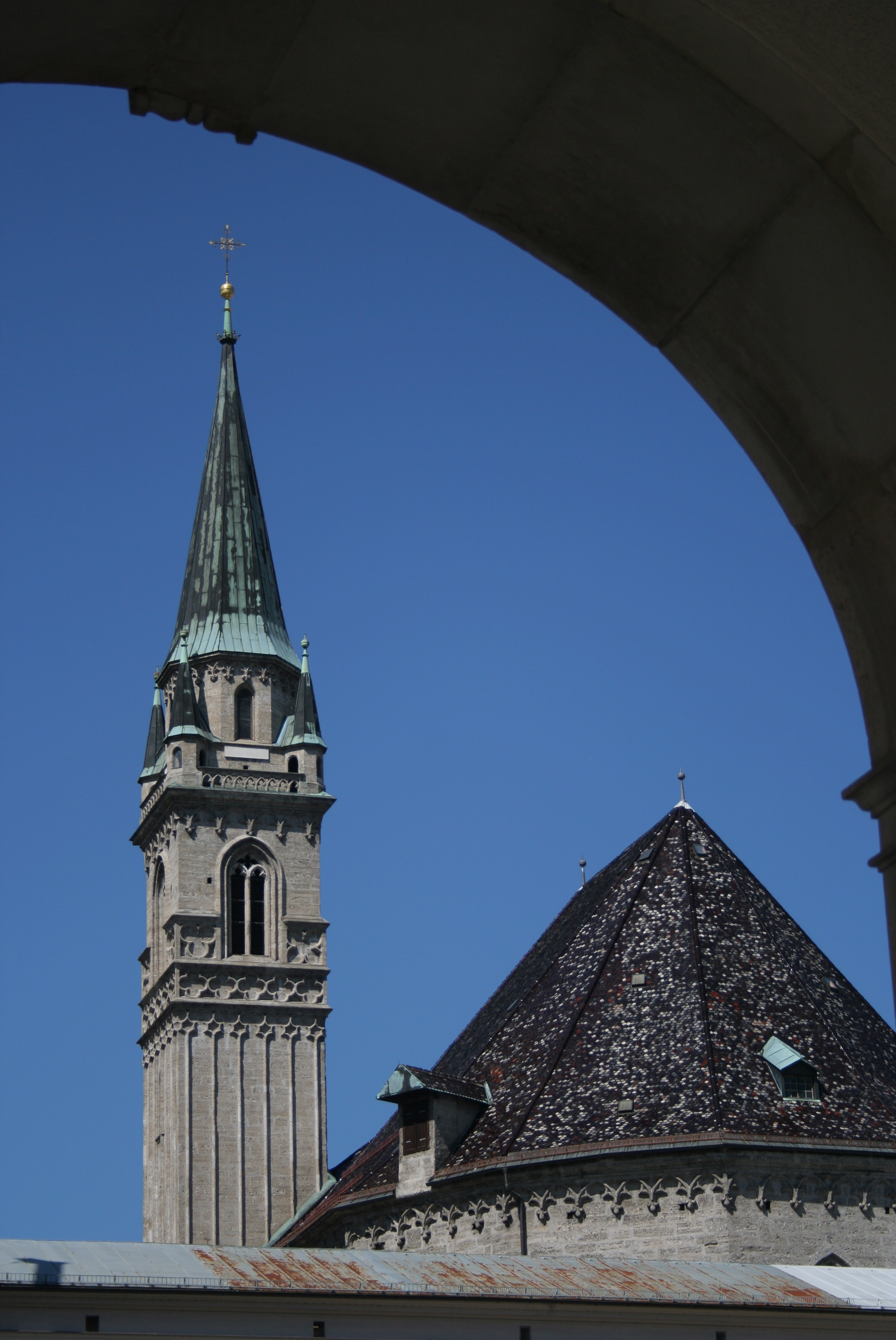
Church tower from the east

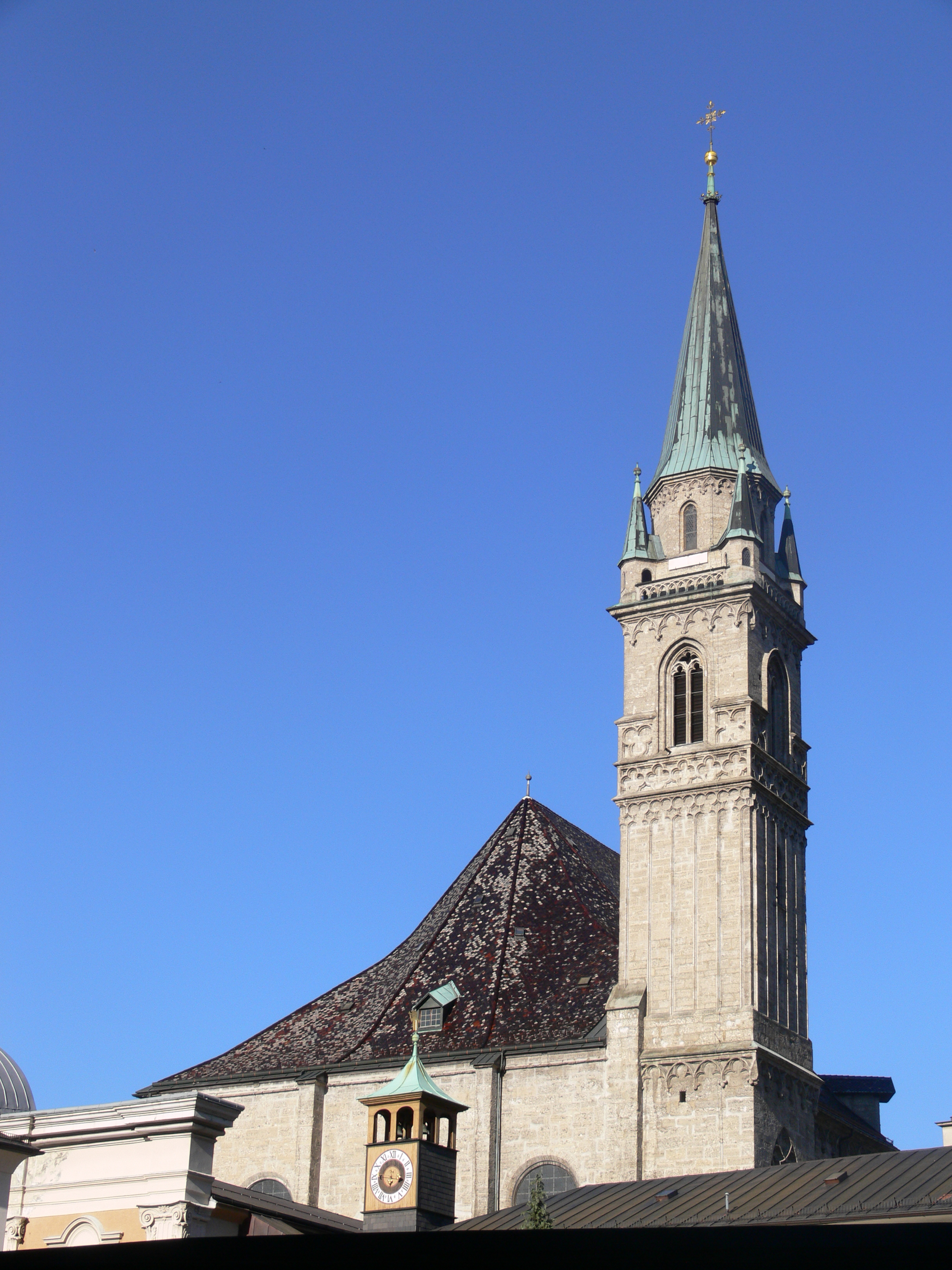
Church tower from the west

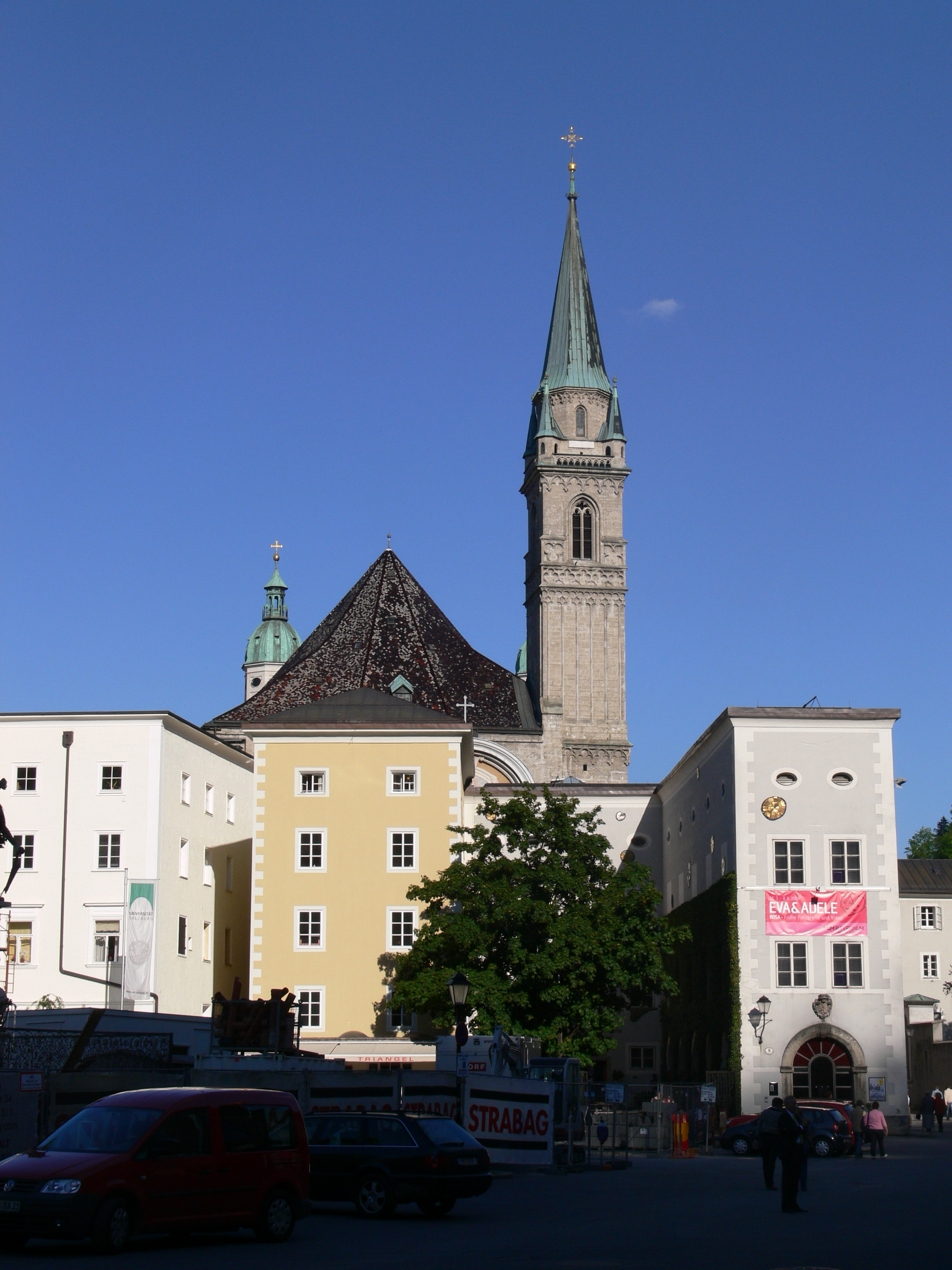
Franciscan Church tower from Max-Reinhardt-Platz

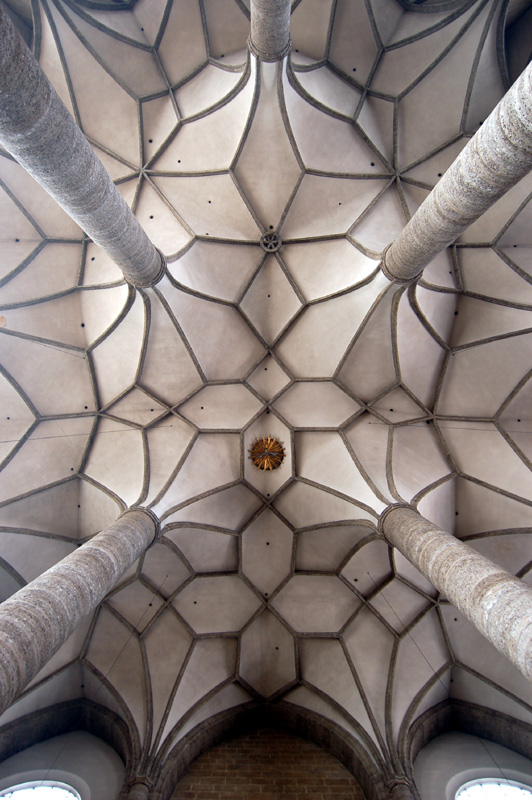
Ceiling detail

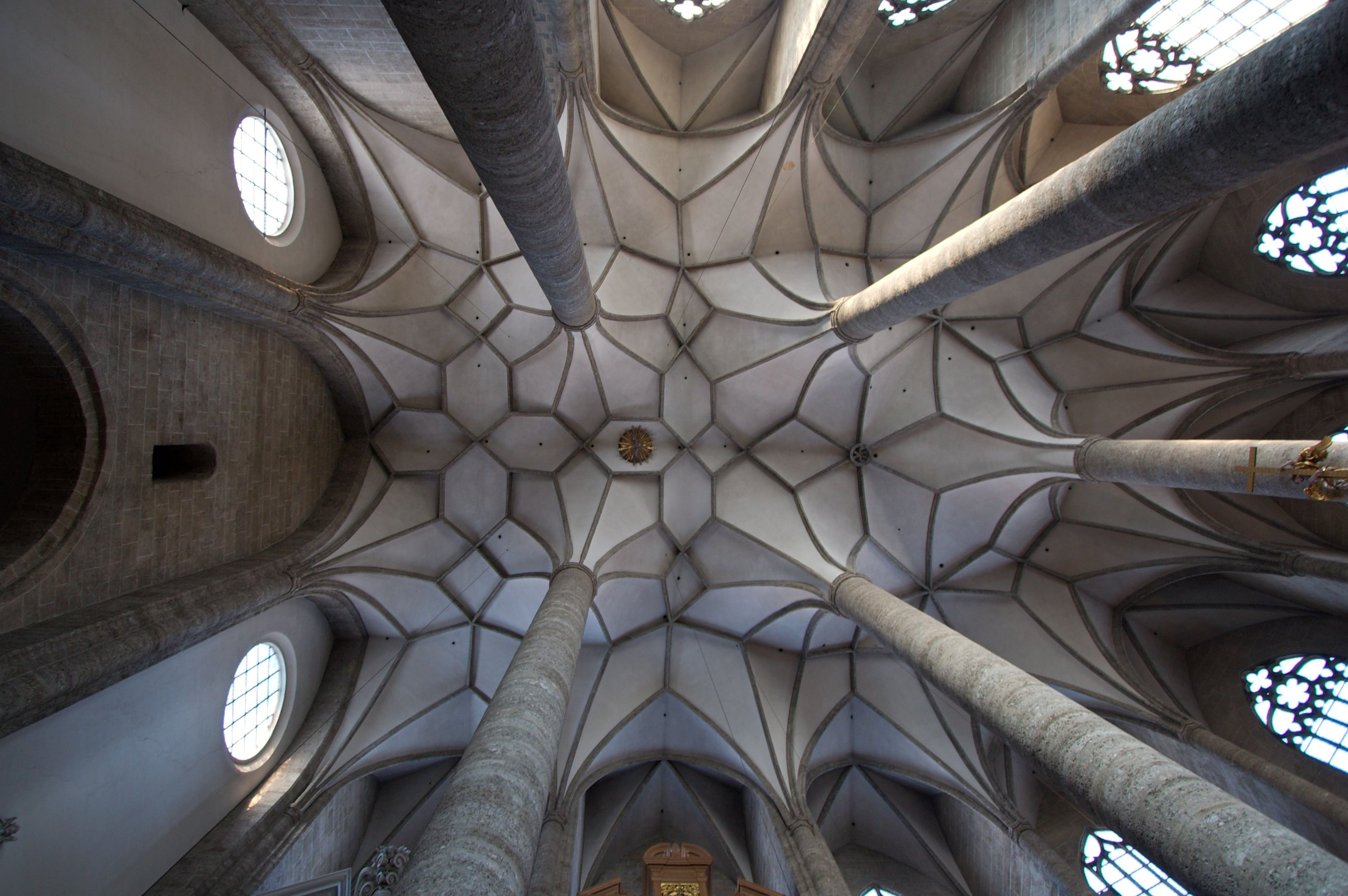
Gothic choir vault

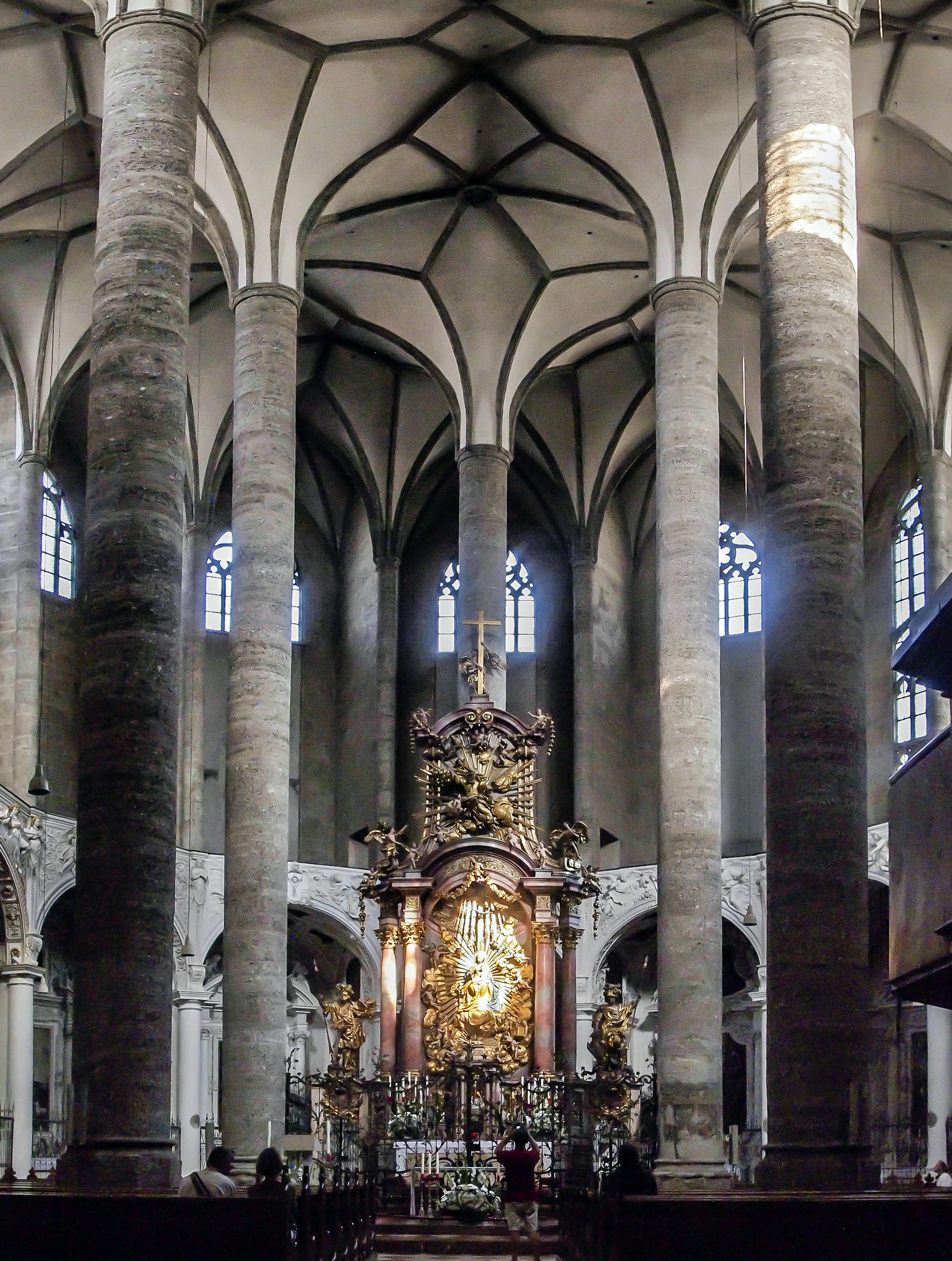
High Altar by Johann Bernhard Fischer von Erlach

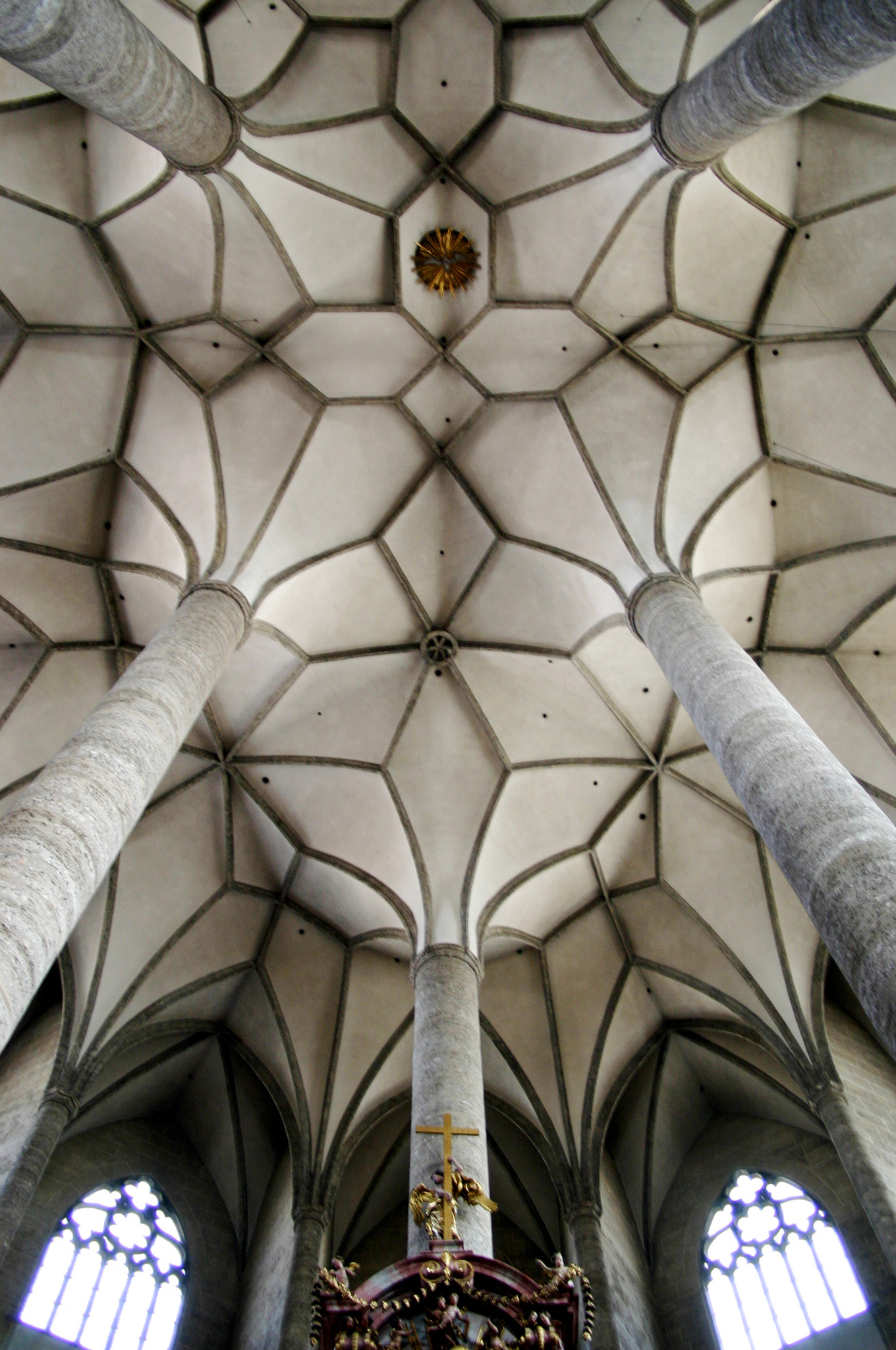
Gothic vault

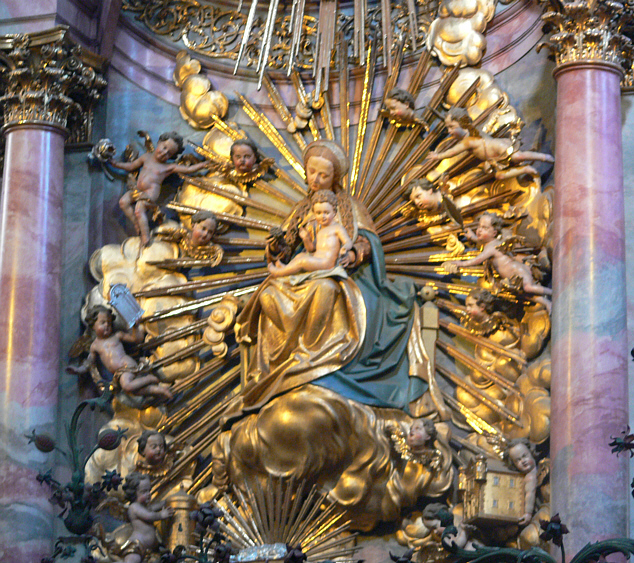
High Altar (detail)

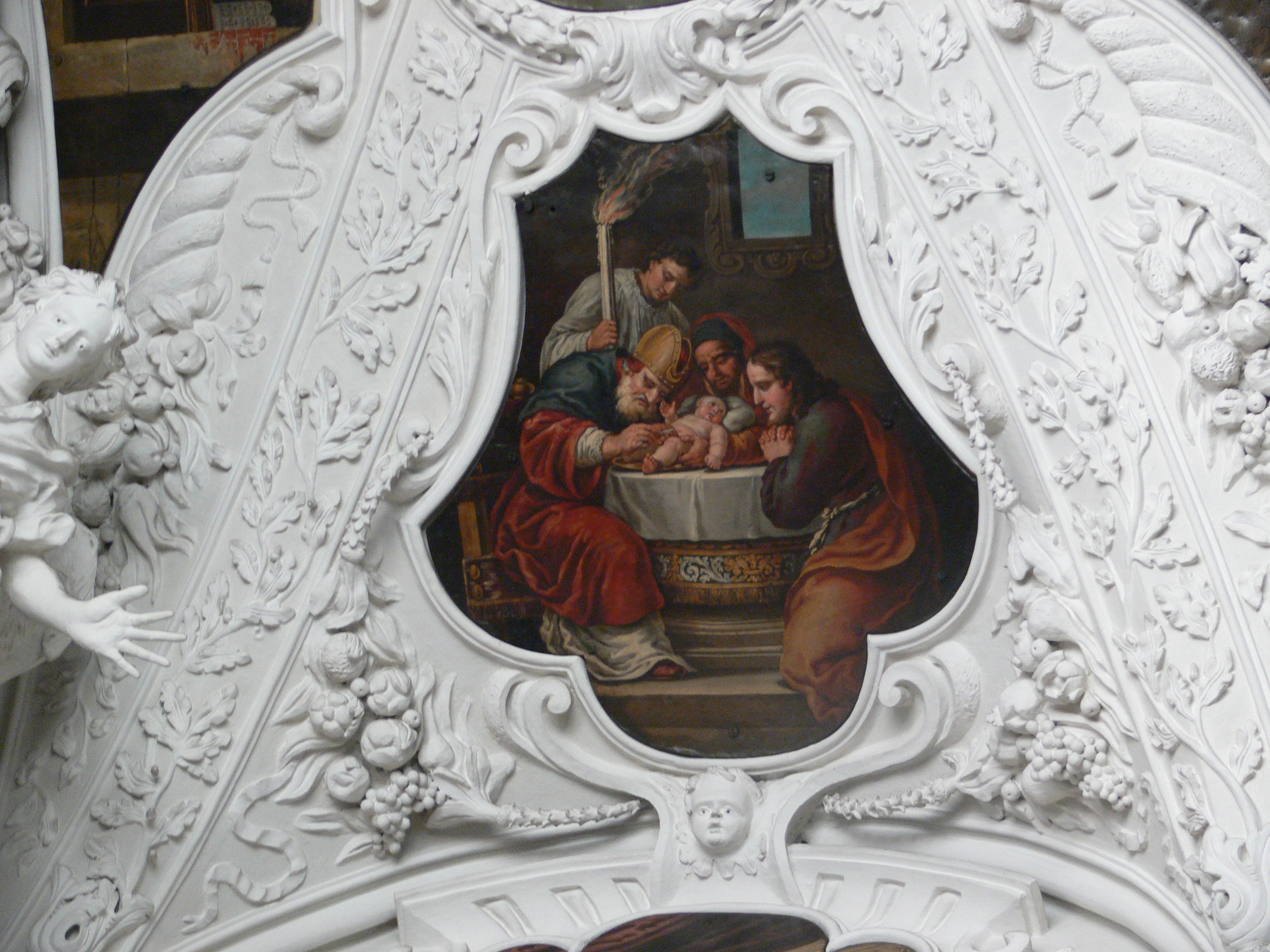
Josephskapelle
