= Salzburger Nockerl =

Austrian sweet soufflé

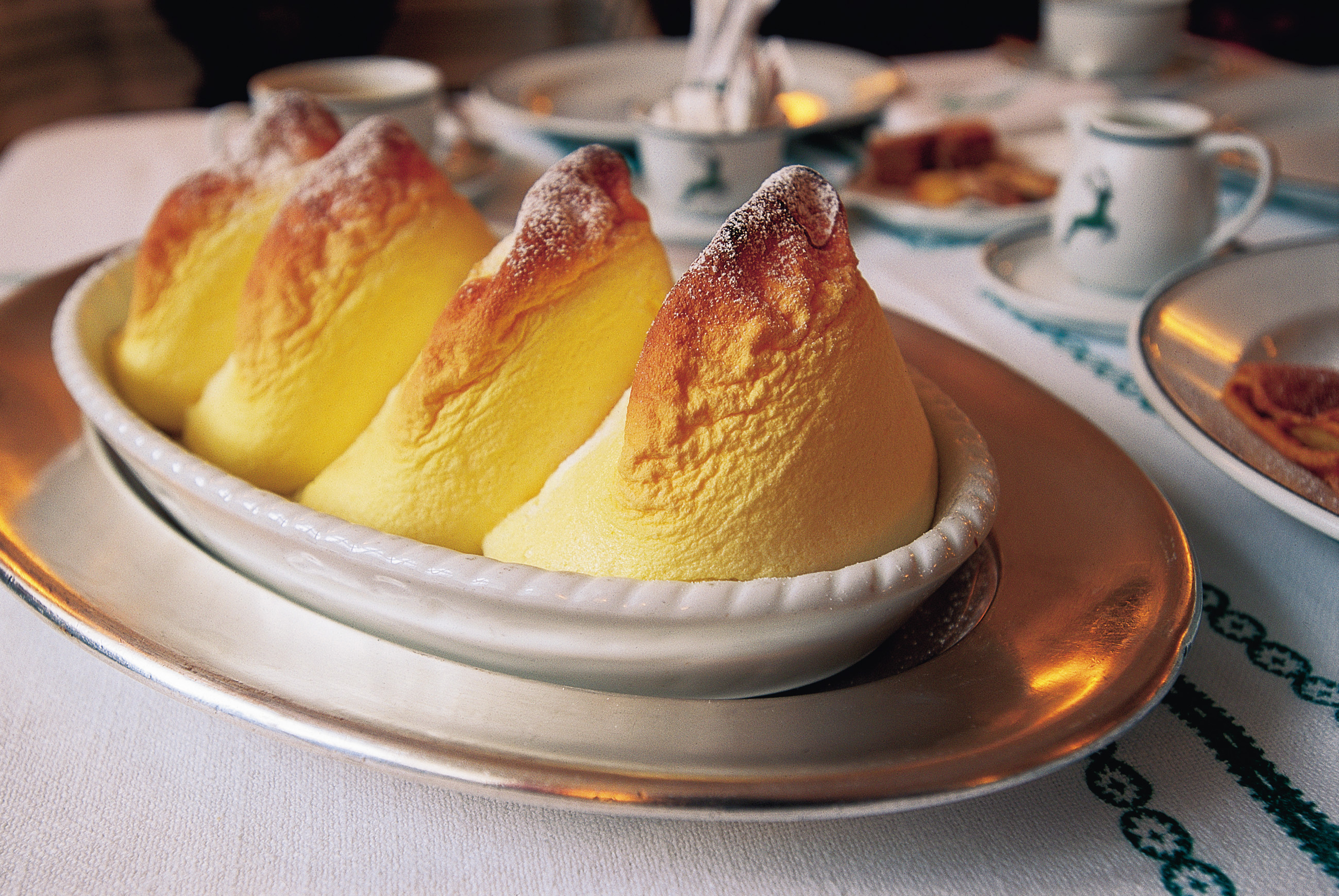
- Salzburger Nockerl as they are typically served
- Type: Soufflé
- Place of origin: Austria
- Region or state: Salzburg
- Main ingredients: Flour, egg yolks, sugar, vanilla, egg whites, raspberry

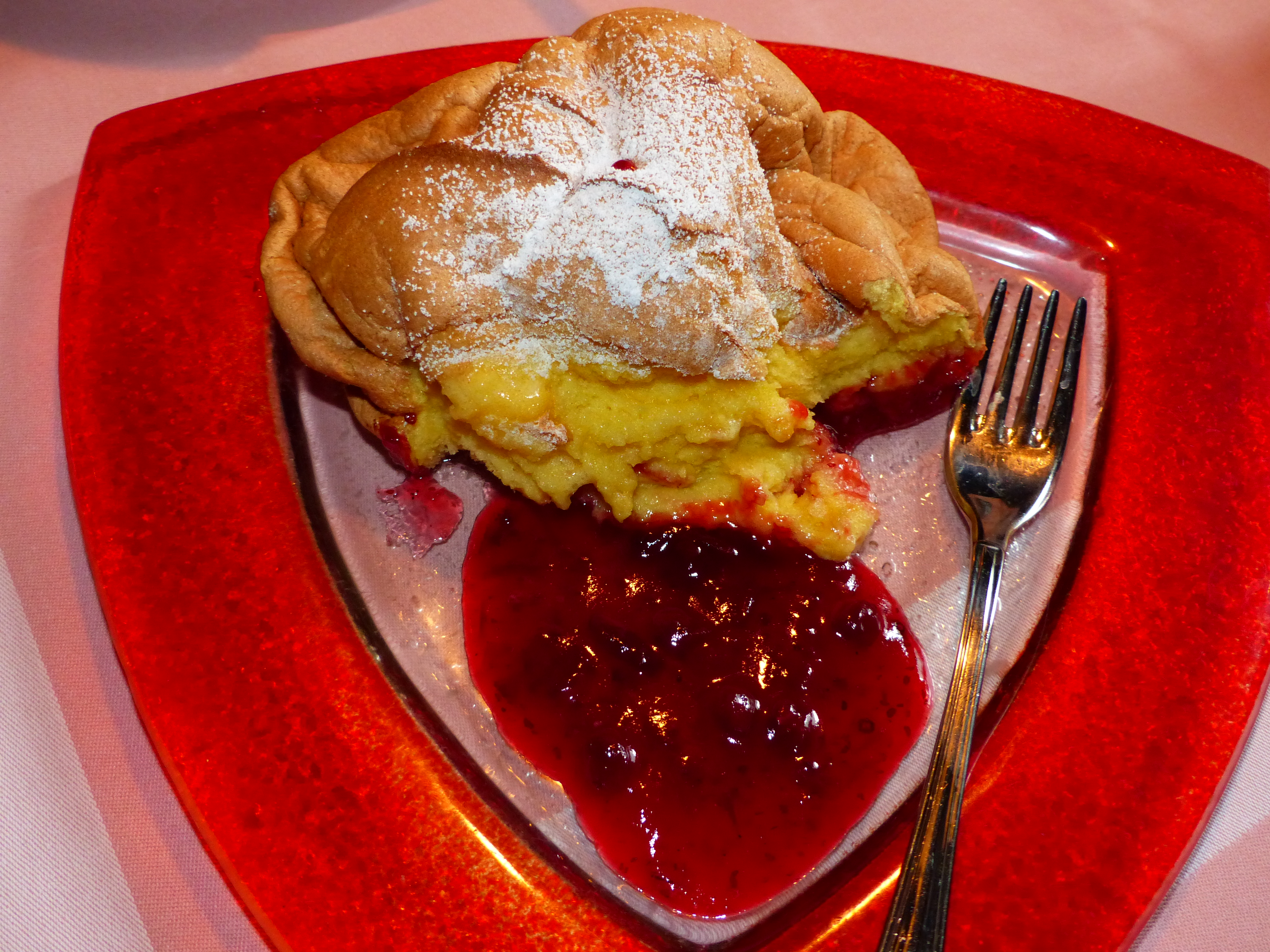
Salzburger Nockerl with raspberry jam

Salzburger Nockerl (pl., Austro-Bavarian: Soizbuaga Noggal) are fluffy dumplings resembling a soufflé, traditionally served as dessert in Salzburg, Austria.

== Recipe ==
The sweet soufflé is made from egg white which is whisked into a meringue until soft peaks form. Then sugar and (not instant) vanilla pudding are mixed into the meringue. Lastly an egg yolk is folded into the mixture. It is carefully spooned into a ceramic baking dish to form 3 peaks, then baked at 350* for about 9 to 10 minutes or until lightly golden brown on the outside.

Salzburger Nockerl are always freshly prepared and served warm with powdered sugar, sometimes with a raspberry sauce or any other fruit spread layered on the bottom of the soufflé. Though traditionally a dessert, the dish is filling enough to be eaten as a main course.

== Cultural significance ==
Although presumably derived from French soufflé dishes, Salzburger Nockerl, like Kaiserschmarrn or Apple strudel, has become an icon of Austrian cuisine. Legend has it that the dish was invented by Salome Alt (1568–1633), the mistress of Prince-Archbishop Wolf Dietrich Raitenau in the early 17th century. In any case, the golden dumplings represent Salzburg's Baroque atmosphere left by the territorial prince, whose life of dissipation came to an end when his archbishopric was challenged by the Bavarian neighbours. They are supposed to represent the hillsides surrounding the city centre: Gaisberg, Mönchsberg and Kapuzinerberg. The dusting of powdered sugar resembles the snow-covered peaks.

Fred Raymond (1900–1954) composed an operetta in 1938 called Saison in Salzburg - Salzburger Nockerln (Season in Salzburg - Salzburger Nockerln). In this composition the sweet dumplings are praised as “Süß wie die Liebe und zart wie ein Kuss” (meaning Sweet as love and tender as a kiss in German).

The character David Slater reminisces about the dish cooked by his ex-wife in the 1953 film Die Jungfrau auf dem Dach.
