= Mülln =

Human settlement in Austria

Coordinates: 47°48′20.1″N 13°2′6.1″E

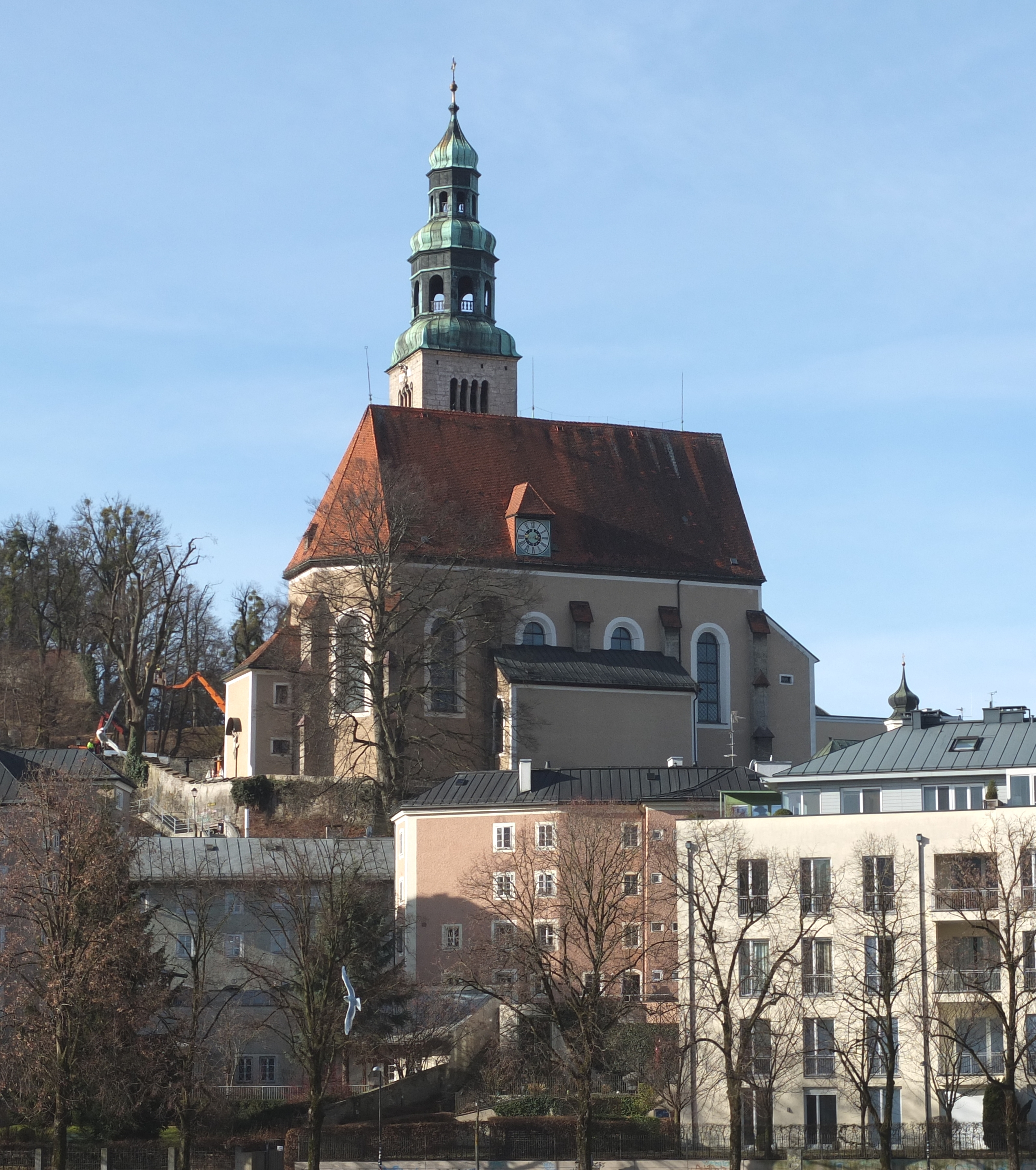
The Pfarrkirche

Mülln (Bavarian: "Mijn" or "Mün") is a small neighborhood in Salzburg, Austria surrounded by the Salzach River and neighborhoods Lehen, Riedenburg and Maxglan. The northern border is formed by the Westbahnlinie (West Train Line), Aiglhofstraße forms the border with Maxglan, and Reichenhallerstraße forms the border with Riedenburg. The old suburb Mülln (Inneres Mülln) belongs to the World Cultural Heritage Site of the city Salzburg. Approximately 1000 residents live in this small neighborhood.

== History ==
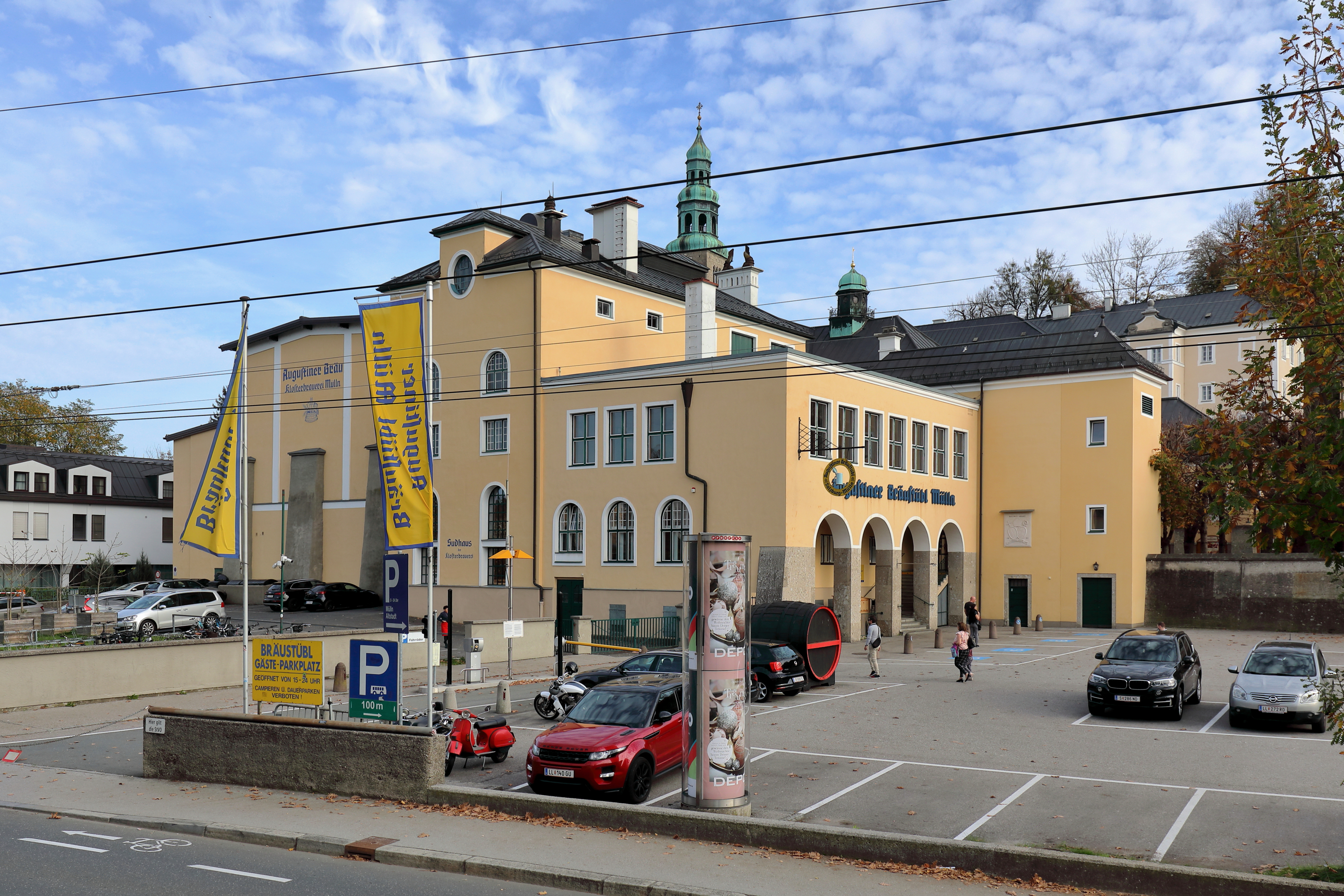
Augustiner Brewery Mülln, founded 1621

Naming: Mülln was first known in 790 as „ad molendina“, named by the Millers. Mülln, which arose from a small milling city, is possibly the oldest suburb of the middle-age fortress city Salzburg. These mills were first supplied with the surplus water of Riedenburg Moor and bordering Wildmoos (now known as Leopoldskroner Moor) and later supplied through an arm of the Almkanal. At its latest, in the 12th century, the area and its core settlement on the north end of Mönchsberg took the name Mülln.

The oldest of Mülln's documented Mills are:

- The Mill of St. Peter's Monastery in the 12th century,
- The Mill of Nonnberg Convent (Salzachmühle),
- The Mill of the Domkapitel (Later named the Heilmayrmühle),
- The Prince Archbishop's Mill (Located at Bärengässchen 4),
- The Wartelstein Mill (Later named the Glaninger Mill) from 1330.

Today there are almost no remaining mills in Mülln. The Monastery's and Salzach's Mills belonged earlier to the Merciful Sisters and exist today as the property of St. Peter's Monastery located in Aiglhof. Mülln once possessed 5 city gates, which stood partially prior to 1480, the time of the second city fortification of the city Salzburg:

- Liefering Gate (Das Lieferinger Tor)
- Grimming Gate (Das Grimmingtor)
- Wartelstein Gate(Das Wartelsteintor)
- Two fluid gates to the Salzach River (in Bärengässchen and in Salzachgässchen)

== The Pfarrkirche ==
As of 1835 the Parish of Benedictine Abbey Michaelbeuern has incorporated the Augustine Order "to our dear women of Mülln" („zu Unseren Lieben Frau zu Mülln“). The first mention of a chapel in Mülln was in 1148. Archbishop Gebhard at this time had commissioned the dilapidated altar of the Marien Chapel to be restored. Mülln possibly became the oldest Salzburg suburb to be fortified and militarily secured, complete with walls and guard towers. Also the church, at the time possibly found on the main street, was included as well. A Roman crucifix is preserved from this time.

== Literature ==
- Adolf Hahnl, Hans L. Ostermann, Harald Waitzbauer: 375 Jahre Augustiner Bräu Kloster Mülln in Salzburg. Salzburg 1995
