= Historic Centre of the City of Salzburg =

Old town of Salzburg, Austria, UNESCO World Heritage site

UNESCO World Heritage Site
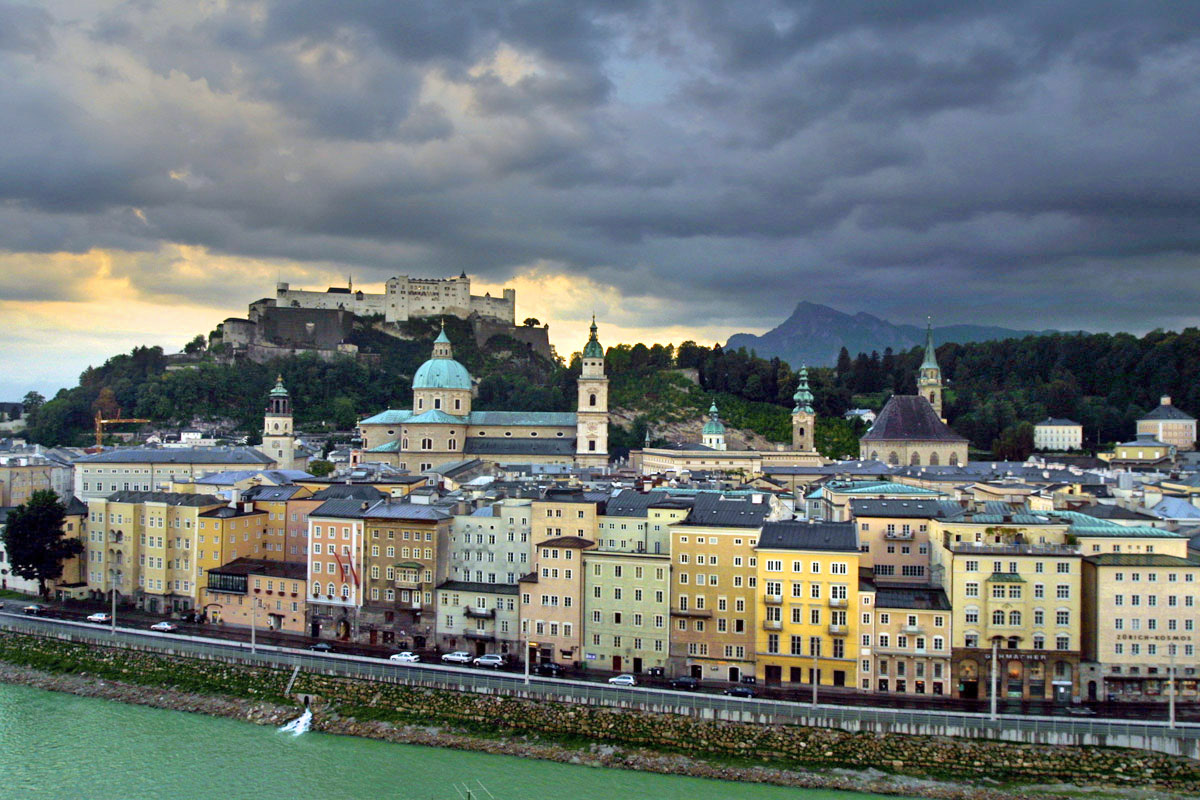

- Location within Austria
- Official name: Historic Centre of the City of Salzburg
- Location: Salzburg, Austria
- Criteria: Cultural: (ii), (iv), (vi)
- Reference: 784
- Inscription: 1996 (20th Session)
- Area: 236 ha (0.91 sq mi)
- Buffer zone: 467 ha (1.80 sq mi)
- Coordinates: 47°48′2″N 13°2′36″E

The Historic Centre of the City of Salzburg, also known as the Altstadt, is a district of Salzburg, Austria, recognized as UNESCO World Heritage Site since 1996. It corresponds with the historic city center, situated on the left and right banks of the Salzach river.

The listing of the World Heritage Site describes it thus: "Salzburg has managed to preserve an extraordinarily rich urban fabric, developed over the period from the Middle Ages to the 19th century when it was a city-state ruled by a prince-archbishop. Its Flamboyant Gothic art attracted many craftsmen and artists before the city became even better known through the work of the Italian architects Vincenzo Scamozzi and Santini Solari, to whom the centre of Salzburg owes much of its Baroque appearance. This meeting-point of northern and southern Europe perhaps sparked the genius of Salzburg's most famous son, Wolfgang Amadeus Mozart, whose name has been associated with the city ever since."

The listed area comprises a core zone of 236 hectares (580 acres), including the old city on both banks of the Salzach river together with the Mönchsberg, Festungsberg and Kapuzinerberg hills that surround the old city to west and east. Beyond the core zone there is a buffer zone of 467 hectares (1,150 acres) which is intended to protect the core zone being affected by development visible in long distance views.

== Sites and monuments ==
Sites and monuments in the core zone of the historic centre include:

- Felsenreitschule, an open-air theatre built in the quarry used for the construction of Salzburg Cathedral
- Franziskanerkirche, one of Salzburg's oldest buildings, dating from 1208 and used by the Franciscans since 1642
- Getreidegasse, a busy narrow shopping street characterised by numerous high townhouses
- Großes Festspielhaus, an opera house and concert hall dating from 1960 and built for the annual Salzburg Festival
- Haus für Mozart, formerly the Kleines Festspielhaus, an opera house and concert hall dating from 1925
- Hohensalzburg Fortress (Festung Hohensalzburg), overlooking the Old Town, one of the largest castles in Europe
- Holy Trinity Church (Dreifaltigkeitskirche), dating from 1694
- Hotel Goldener Hirsch, a five-star hotel located in a building on Getreidegasse dating back to at least 1407
- Kollegienkirche, the Baroque style church of the University of Salzburg
- Mirabell Palace (Schloss Mirabell), a pleasure palace built in 1606 with wide gardens and a marble hall
- Museum der Moderne Salzburg, a modern art museum with locations in the old city and on the Mönchsberg
- Mozartplatz, a historic square with monument to Wolfgang Amadeus Mozart
- Mozart's birthplace (Mozarts Geburtshaus), a house in Getreidegasse that is now a museum dedicated to Mozart
- Nonnberg Abbey (Stift Nonnberg), a Benedictine monastery founded c.712/715
- Residenz, the former residence of the Prince-Archbishops, housing the Residenzgalerie art gallery
- Residenzplatz, a large square outside the Residenz with a large and ornate fountain
- Salzburg Cathedral (Salzburger Dom)
- Salzburger Landestheater, a theatre and venue for opera, theatre, and dance, with resident companies of actors, singers and dancers
- Salzburger Marionettentheater, a marionette theatre established in 1912
- Salzburg Museum, a museum of artistic and cultural history of the city and region of Salzburg housed in the Neue Residenz
- Sigmundstor, an eighteenth century tunnel connecting the Altstadt with the Riedenburg quarter through the Mönchsberg
- Sphaera, a sculpture of a man on a golden sphere (Stephan Balkenhol, 2007)
- St Peter's Abbey (Stift Sankt Peter), a Benedictine monastery founded 696 with a well-known cemetery
- St Sebastian's Church (Sebastianskirche), a church consecrated in 1511
