= Nonnberg Abbey =

Benedictine monastery in Salzburg, Austria

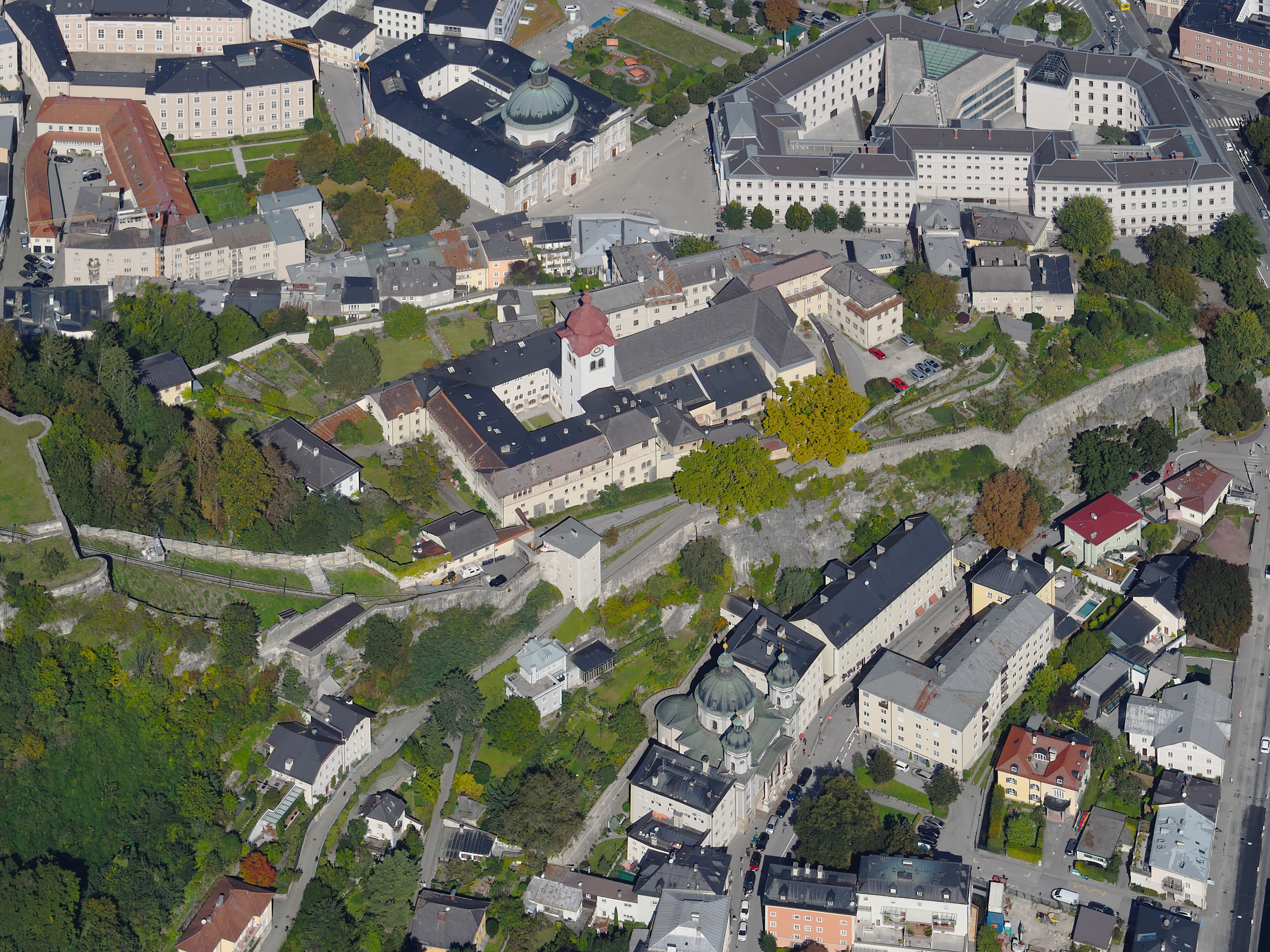
- Nonnberg Abbey, aerial view

- Location within Austria

Religion
- Affiliation: Catholic Church
- Ecclesiastical or organisational status: Active
- Year consecrated: 714
- Status: Convent

Location
- Location: Salzburg, Austria
- State: Salzburg
- Sector: St. John's Chapel
- Coordinates: 47°47′46″N 13°03′06″E

Architecture
- Type: Monastery
- Style: Romanesque, Gothic
- Founder: Saint Rupert of Salzburg

Nonnberg Abbey (German: Stift Nonnberg) is a Benedictine monastery in Salzburg, Austria. Founded c. 712/715 by Saint Rupert of Salzburg, it is the oldest continuously existing nunnery in the German-speaking world. The monastery complex is today a protected monument and part of the Historic Centre of the City of Salzburg, a UNESCO World Heritage Site since 1996.

== History ==
In the early eighth century, Rupert of Salzburg established the monastery beneath the Festungsberg hill and the ruined fortifications of the former Roman city of Juvavum. Its first abbess was Saint Erentrudis of Salzburg, who was either a niece or a sister of Bishop Rupert. Since 1624 she has held the title of "Landesmutter Salzburgs" (Mother of Salzburg) and her tomb is in the crypt of the church.

The abbey's endowment was provided by the Agilolfing duke Theodo of Bavaria and his successor Theodbert. The abbey became independent of the founding house from 987. The nuns, all of noble birth, held extended estates up the Salzach river in the south of the city. The obligation of nobility for the nuns – a prerequisite for admission to the convent – which had existed since the Middle Ages, was abolished in 1848. The convent's possessions were later augmented by Emperor Henry II, who was also Duke of Bavaria.

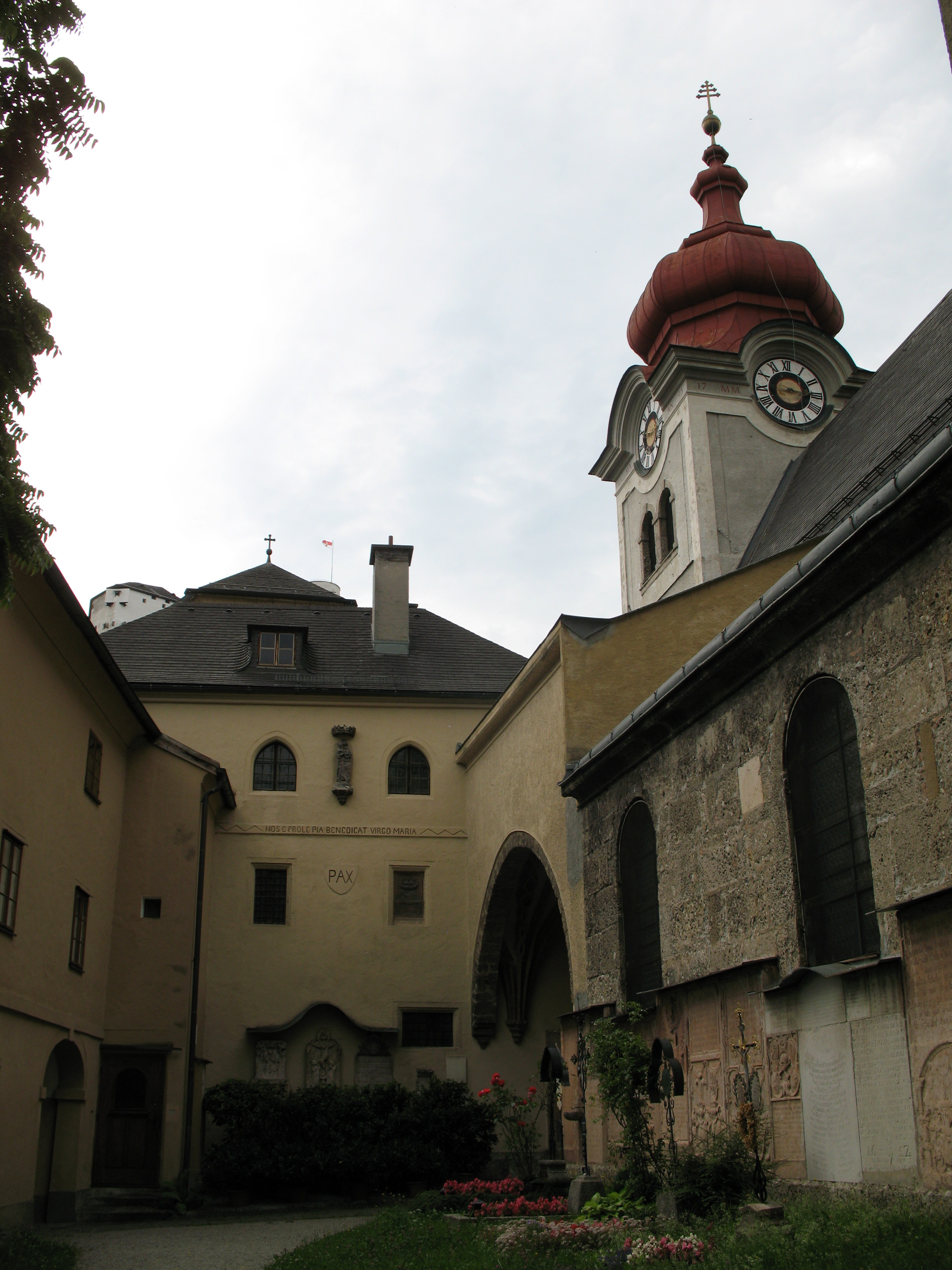
Abbey Church

After a blaze about 1006, the abbey church was re-built with the support of Henry II; he and his consort Cunigunde of Luxembourg attended the consecration in 1009. This Romanesque building was again largely destroyed in a fire of 1423. Reconstruction took place between 1464 and 1509. In 1624 the church was enlarged by the addition of three side chapels. A refurbishment in the Baroque style took place in the 1880s.

The Benedictine rule was implemented under Archbishop Conrad I of Salzburg in the early 12th century. The late Gothic winged altar with the statue of Mary is the centrepiece of the abbey church.

== Present day ==
The nuns sing Gregorian Chorals every morning at 6:45, and in the evenings at different times.

About 195 manuscripts dating from the 14th to the 18th century have been copied to film by the Hill Museum and Manuscript Library.

== Commemorative coin ==
The Abbey was selected as main motif for the Austrian Nonnberg Abbey commemorative coin minted on April 5, 2006. This was the first coin of the series "Great Abbeys of Austria". It shows the Benedictine convent of Nonnberg Abbey. On the hilltop in the background, Hohensalzburg Fortress and the Kajetaner church can be seen. The abbey and fortress are connected by the Reisszug, one of the world's oldest extant railways.

== In popular culture ==
At Nonnberg the story of Maria von Trapp began, who became a postulant there in 1924 and whose life was the basis for the 1959 Broadway musical and 1965 film, The Sound of Music. The abbess during Maria's time at Nonnberg was Virgilia Lütz (1869-1949). Some scenes from the movie were filmed at the abbey.

== Gallery ==
Euro gold and silver commemorative coin

The wooden Gothic altar in the St. John's Chapel by the sculptor Veit Stoss

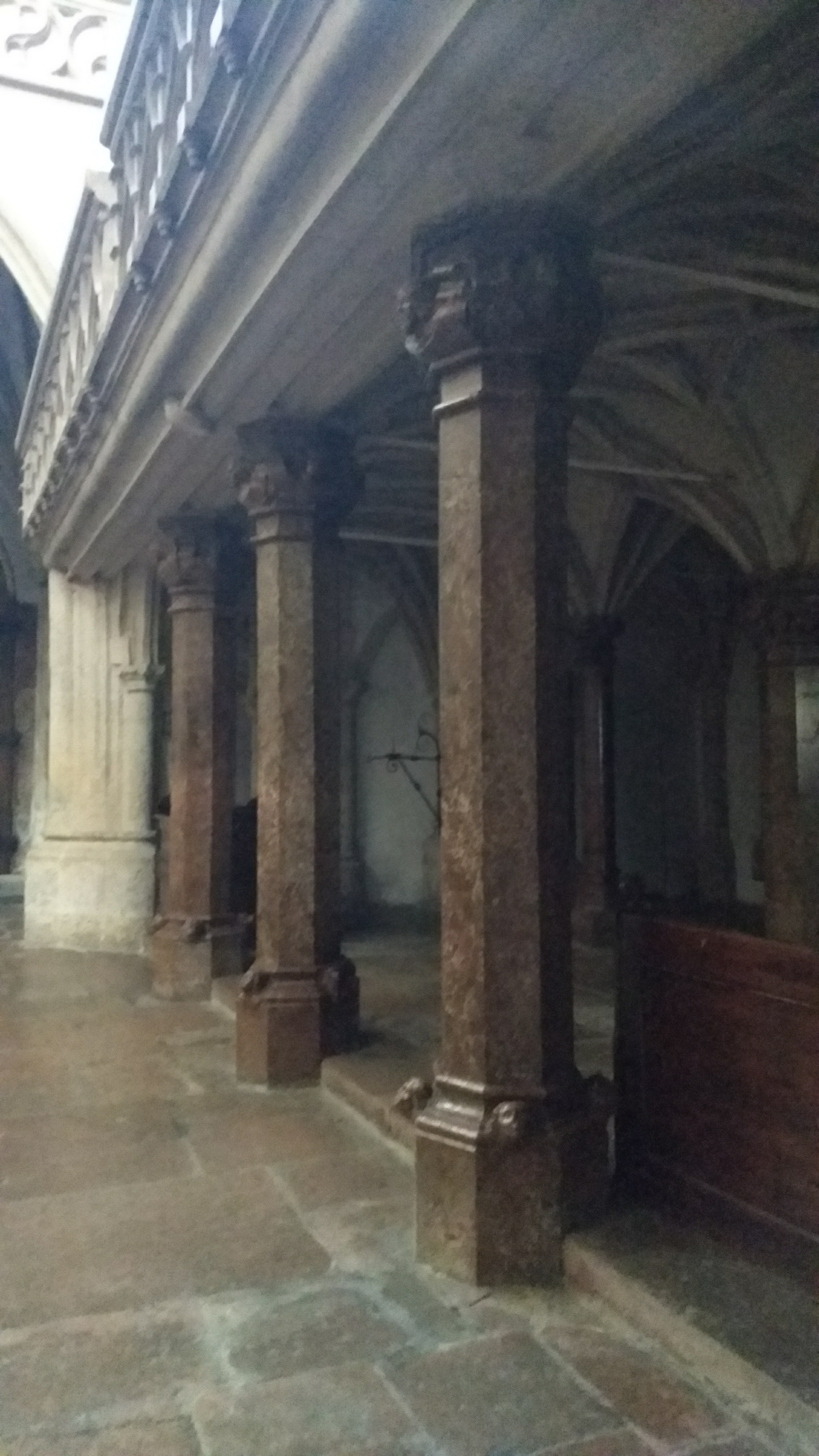
Pillars inside the St. John's Chapel in Nonnberg Abbey

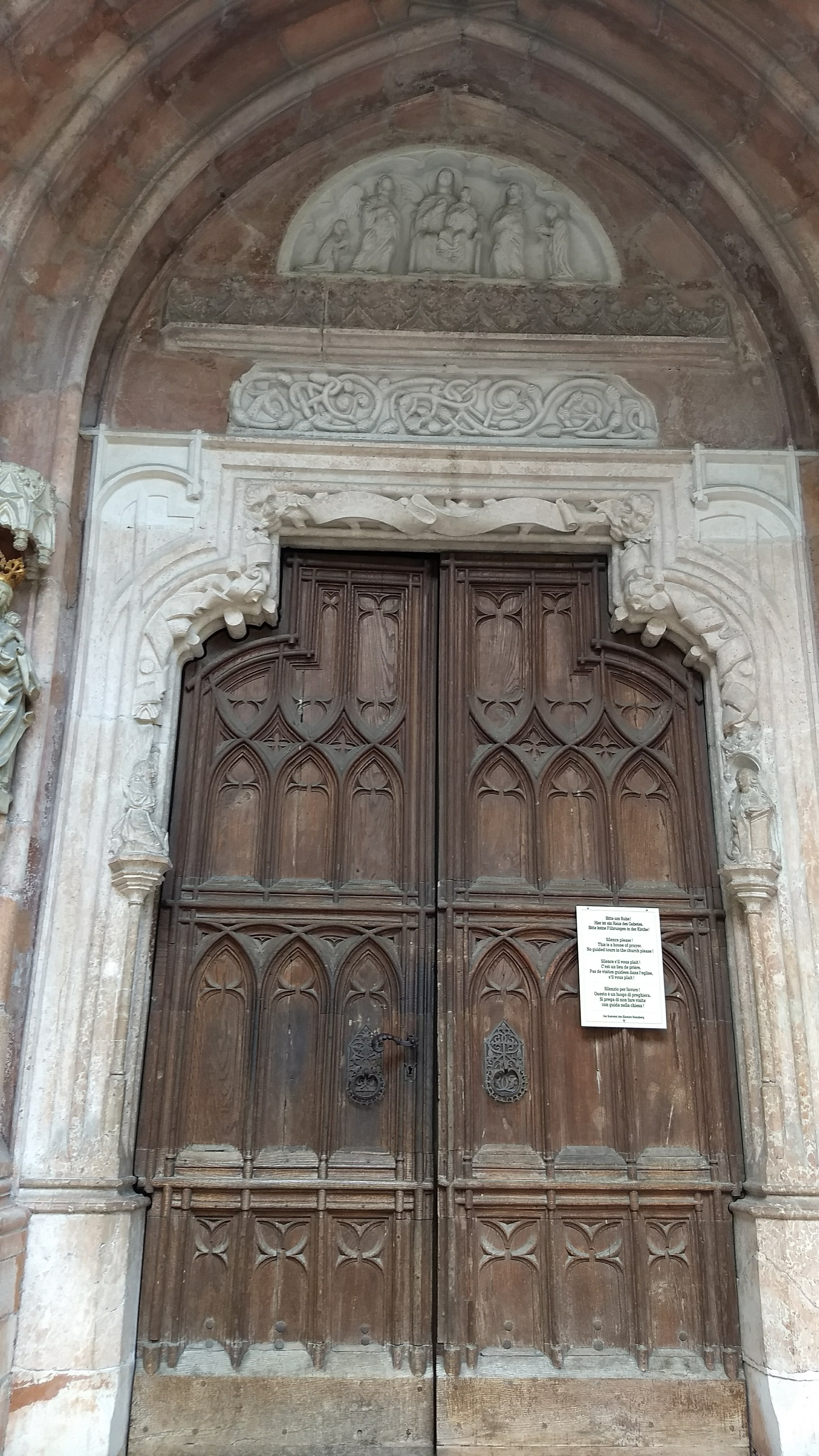
The entrance door to the St. John's Chapel in Nonnberg Abbey which is open to the public

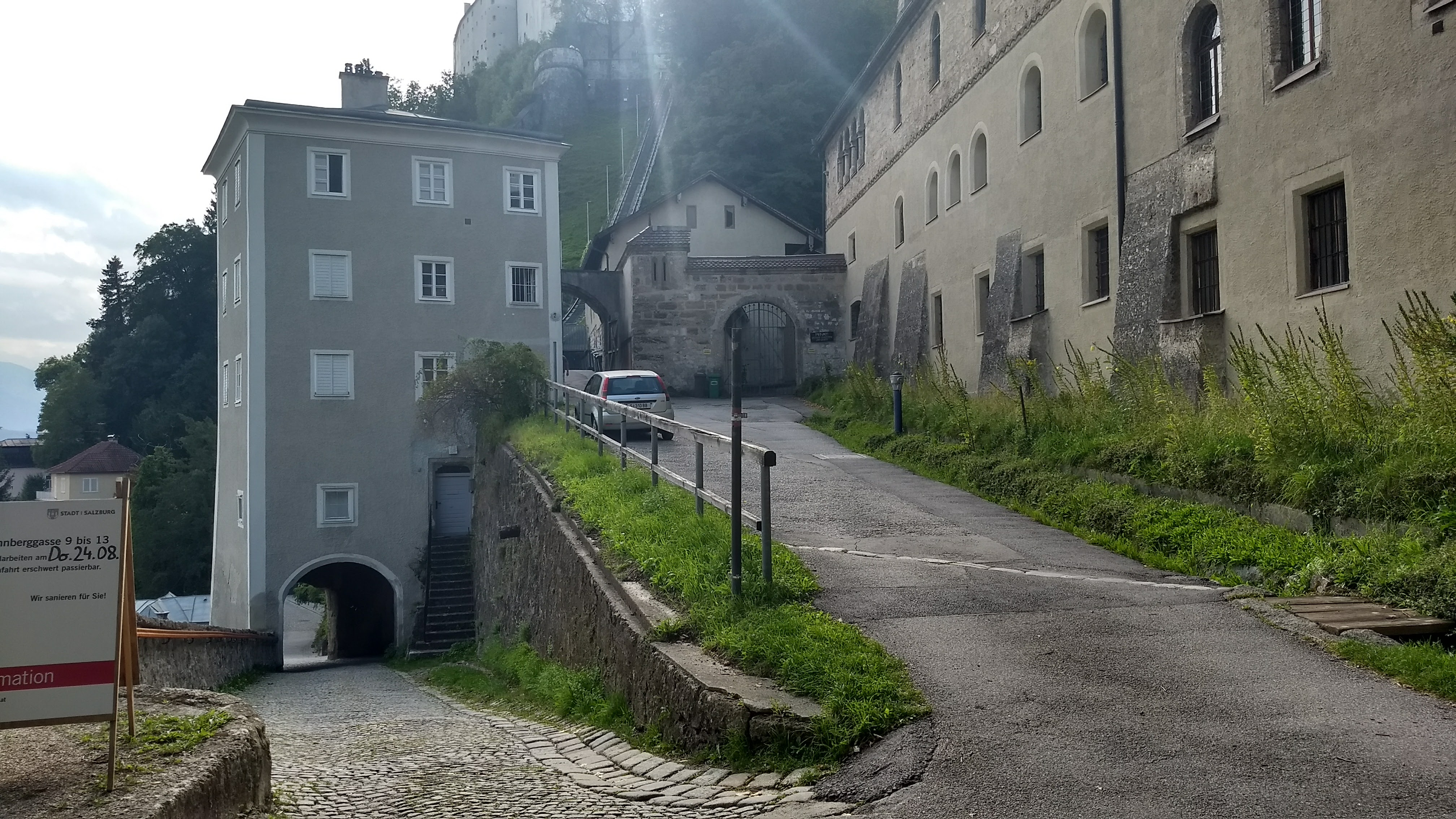
The road to the gate of Nonnberg Abbey

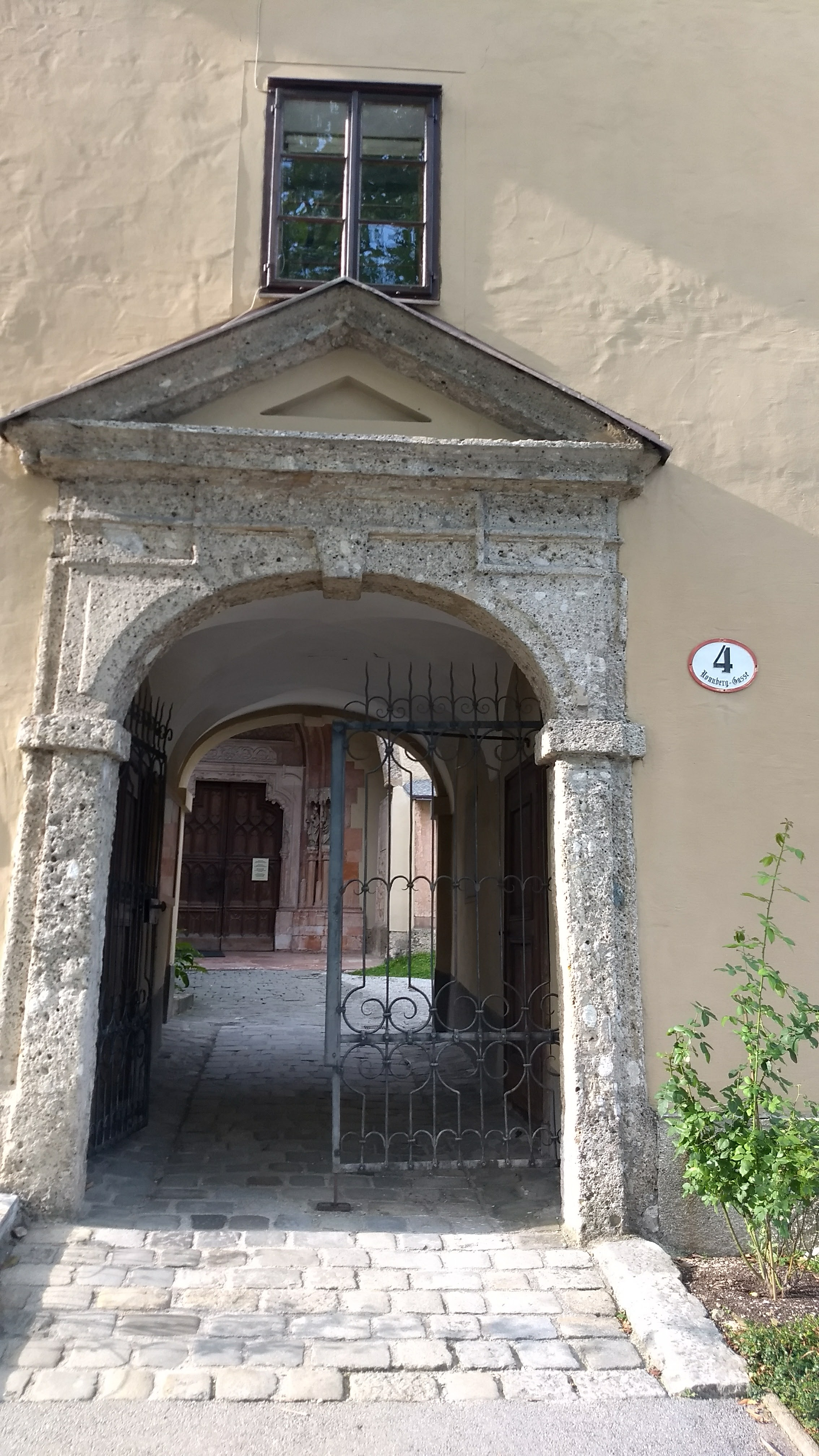
The entrance gate of the Nonnberg Abbey which is open to the public

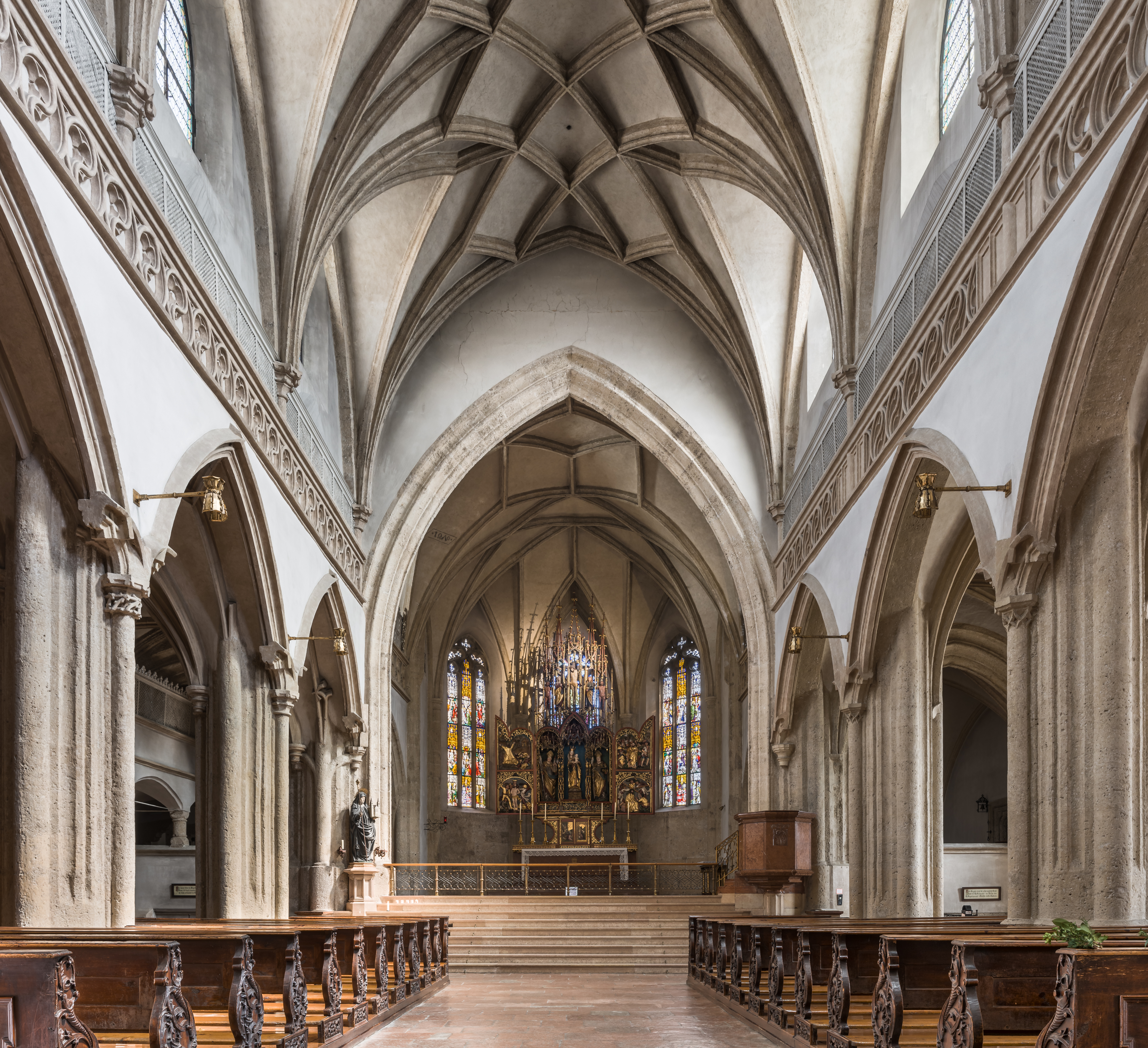
Interior
