= List of World Heritage Sites in Austria =

Locations of World Heritage Sites in Austria. Blue dots indicate the Prehistoric pile dwellings around the Alps and cyan dots are the Beech Forests. There are 46 sites of the Danube Limes in Austria, they are not shown on the map.

The United Nations Educational, Scientific and Cultural Organization (UNESCO) World Heritage Sites are places of importance to cultural or natural heritage as described in the UNESCO World Heritage Convention, established in 1972. Cultural heritage consists of monuments (such as architectural works, monumental sculptures, or inscriptions), groups of buildings, and sites (including archaeological sites). Natural heritage consists of natural features (physical and biological formations), geological and physiographical formations (including habitats of threatened species of animals and plants), and natural sites which are important from the point of view of science, conservation, or natural beauty. Austria ratified the convention on December 18, 1992, making its historical sites eligible for inclusion on the list.

Sites in Austria were first inscribed on the list at the 20th Session of the World Heritage Committee, held in Mérida, Mexico in 1996. At that session, two sites were added: the Historic Centre of Salzburg, and the Palace and Gardens of Schönbrunn. As of 2025, Austria has 12 sites inscribed on the list and a further 2 on the tentative list. Five World Heritage Sites are shared with other countries: Fertő / Neusiedlersee Cultural Landscape is shared with Hungary; Prehistoric pile dwellings around the Alps with France, Germany, Italy, Slovenia and Switzerland; Ancient and Primeval Beech Forests of the Carpathians and Other Regions of Europe with 17 European countries; the Great Spa Towns of Europe with Belgium, Czechia, Germany, France, Italy, and the United Kingdom; and the Danube Limes with Germany and Slovakia. From 2017 to 2026, the site Historic Centre of Vienna was on the list of World Heritage in Danger due to planned new high-rise buildings. All but one of the World Heritage Sites in Austria are of the cultural type.

== World Heritage Sites ==
UNESCO lists sites under ten criteria; each entry must meet at least one of the criteria. Criteria i through vi are cultural, and vii through x are natural.

* Transnational site

Site	Image	Location (state)	Year listed	UNESCO data	Description
Historic Centre of the City of Salzburg		Salzburg	1996	784; ii, iv, vi (cultural)	Salzburg played a crucial role in the interchange between Italian and German cultures, resulting in a flowering of the two cultures and a long-lasting exchange between them, which is visible especially in the Baroque architecture. Salzburg is a prime example of a European ecclesiastical city-state, resulting in many important buildings, both secular and religious, from the Gothic period to the 20th century. The city is also well known for its associations with the arts, especially with the composer Wolfgang Amadeus Mozart.
Palace and Gardens of Schönbrunn		Vienna	1996	786; i, iv (cultural)	Schönbrunn was the residence of the Habsburg emperors from the 18th century to 1918. It was built in the Rococo style as a single, unified project. It was designed by the architects Johann Bernhard Fischer von Erlach and Nicolaus Pacassi and is the site of the world's oldest continuously operating zoo.
Hallstatt–Dachstein / Salzkammergut Cultural Landscape	Hallstatt town at the lake	Styria and Upper Austria	1997	806; iii, iv (cultural)	The mining of salt deposits, exploited since the 2nd millennium BCE, brought prosperity to the region. The town gave name to the Hallstatt culture, the Iron Age society. The region is also known for its mountain ranges and caves, the longest of the latter reaching a length of 81 km (50 mi).
Semmering railway		Lower Austria and Styria	1998	785; ii, iv (cultural)	The Semmering railway was built between 1848 and 1854 and covers 41 km (25 mi) of rugged mountains. This project was undertaken in the early days of railway construction and required a number of innovations. The tunnels, viaducts and other works are still in use today.
City of Graz – Historic Centre and Schloss Eggenberg		Styria	1999	931; ii, iv (cultural)	A branch of the Habsburg family lived in Graz for centuries. The Habsburgs and other local nobles beautified and expanded Graz over centuries, leading to a city with grand buildings in a number of styles.
Wachau Cultural Landscape		Lower Austria	2000	970; ii, iv (cultural)	The Wachau is a 40 km (25 mi) long valley along the Danube river between Melk and Krems. The valley was settled in prehistoric times and has been an important region since then. It is home to a number of historic towns, villages, monasteries, castles and ruins.
Fertő / Neusiedlersee Cultural Landscape*		Burgenland	2001	772; v (cultural)	The Fertő/Neusiedler Lake area has been occupied by different peoples for eight millennia. The original network of towns and villages dates to the 12th and 13th centuries. Several palaces were constructed in the 18th and 19th centuries. The site is shared with Hungary.
Historic Centre of Vienna		Vienna	2001	1033; ii, iv, vi (cultural)	Vienna, the capital of the Habsburg Empire, has long been acknowledged to be the musical capital of Europe. The historic centre is rich in architectural ensembles in various styles, including Baroque castles and gardens, as well as the late-19th-century Ringstraße. From 2017 to 2026, the site was on the list of World Heritage in Danger due to planned new high-rise buildings.
Prehistoric pile dwellings around the Alps*		Carinthia and Upper Austria	2011	1363; iv, v (cultural)	The site encompasses the remains of prehistoric pile-dwelling (or stilt house) settlements in and around the Alps built from around 5000 to 500 BCE on the edges of lakes, rivers or wetlands. They contain a wealth of information on life and trade in agrarian Neolithic and Bronze Age cultures in Alpine Europe. There are five sites listed in Austria. The site is shared with France, Germany, Italy, Slovenia, and Switzerland.
Ancient and Primeval Beech Forests of the Carpathians and Other Regions of Europe*		Lower Austria and Upper Austria	2017	1133quater; ix (natural)	Primeval Beech Forests of the Carpathians are used to study the spread of the beech tree (Fagus sylvatica) in the Northern Hemisphere across a variety of environments and the environment in the forest. The site was first listed in 2007 in Slovakia and Ukraine. It was extended in 2011, 2017, and 2021 to include forests in a total of 18 countries. Five forests in Austria were listed in 2017, one in Dürrenstein and four in Kalkalpen (pictured).
Frontiers of the Roman Empire – The Danube Limes (Western Segment)*	Map of Danubian Limes in Austria	Lower Austria, Upper Austria, Vienna	2021	1608rev; ii, iii, iv (cultural)	The Danubian Limes, a network of fortifications along the Danube river, protected the borders of the Roman Empire. The Austrian section is 357.5 km (222.1 mi) long and includes sites at 46 locations. The site is shared with Germany and Slovakia.
The Great Spa Towns of Europe*	Park entrance in Baden bei Wien	Lower Austria	2021	1613; ii, iii, iv, vi (cultural)	The Great Spa Towns of Europe comprises 11 spa towns in seven European countries where mineral waters were used for healing and therapeutic purposes before the development of industrial medication in the 19th century. The town of Baden bei Wien is listed in Austria.

== Tentative list ==
In addition to sites inscribed on the World Heritage list, member states can maintain a list of tentative sites that they may consider for nomination. Nominations for the World Heritage list are only accepted if the site was previously listed on the tentative list. As of 2025, Austria recorded 2 sites on its tentative list.

World Heritage Sites
Site	Image	Location (state)	Year listed	UNESCO criteria	Description
Iron Trail with Erzberg and the old town of Steyr	Steyr	Upper Austria	2002	i, ii, iii, iv (cultural)	The Erzberg region, between the towns of Leoben and Hieflau in Styria, is home to large deposits of iron ore. The open pit mining has transformed the mountainsides, while the area features several facilities connected to iron smelting and trading activities. The old town of Steyr is one of the most significant historic industrial towns in Austria, situated at a confluence of two rivers which both powered the iron industry and provided transportation routes.
Großglockner High Alpine Road / Großglockner Hochalpenstraße	Grossglockner road	Carinthia and Salzburg	2016	i, ii, iv (cultural)	The road was built in the 1930s into a pristine mountain landscape to make it accessible to a large public, following the popularisation of tourism in the High Alpine region. It showcases the technical development of high mountain road building and the management of tourism sites in the early 20th century.

== See also ==
- List of Intangible Cultural Heritage elements in Austria
