= Kapuzinerberg =

Mountain in Austria

Coordinates: 47°48′16″N 13°3′26″E

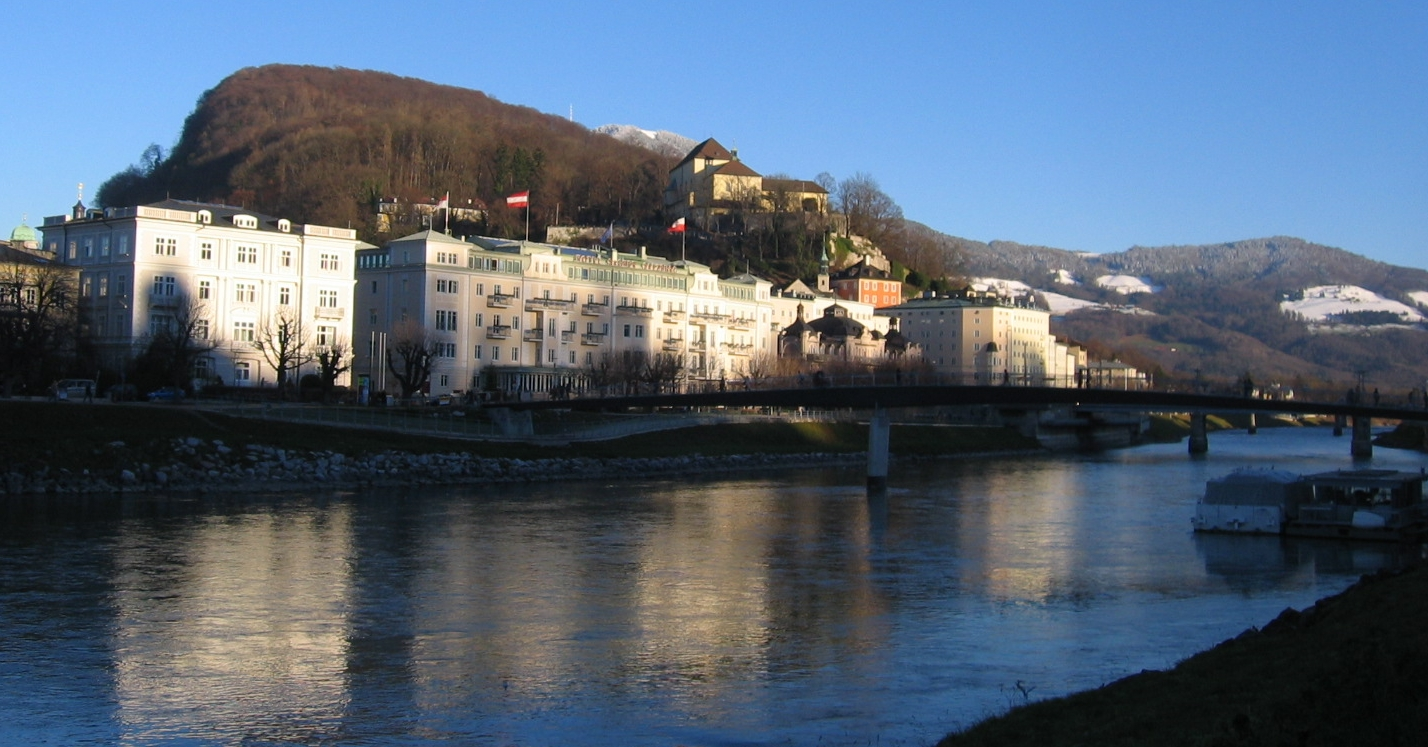
Kapuzinerberg, Salzburg

Kapuzinerberg is a hill on the eastern bank of the Salzach river in the city of Salzburg in Austria, which rises to an elevation of 640 metres (2,100 ft). It is located to the north of Salzburg's historic city centre, and forms part of the city's UNESCO World Heritage Site.

== History ==
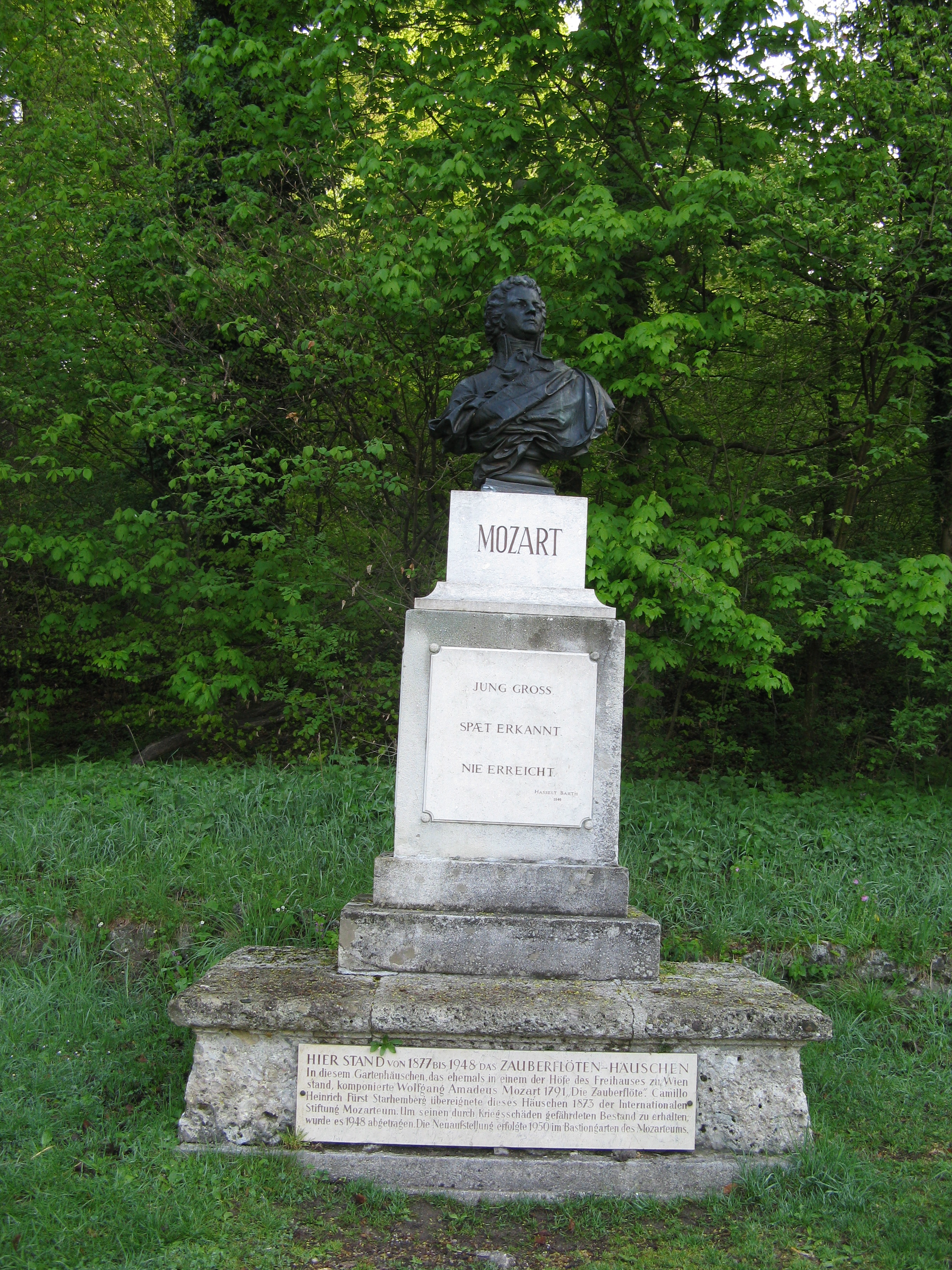
A memorial place for Wolfgang Amadeus Mozart.

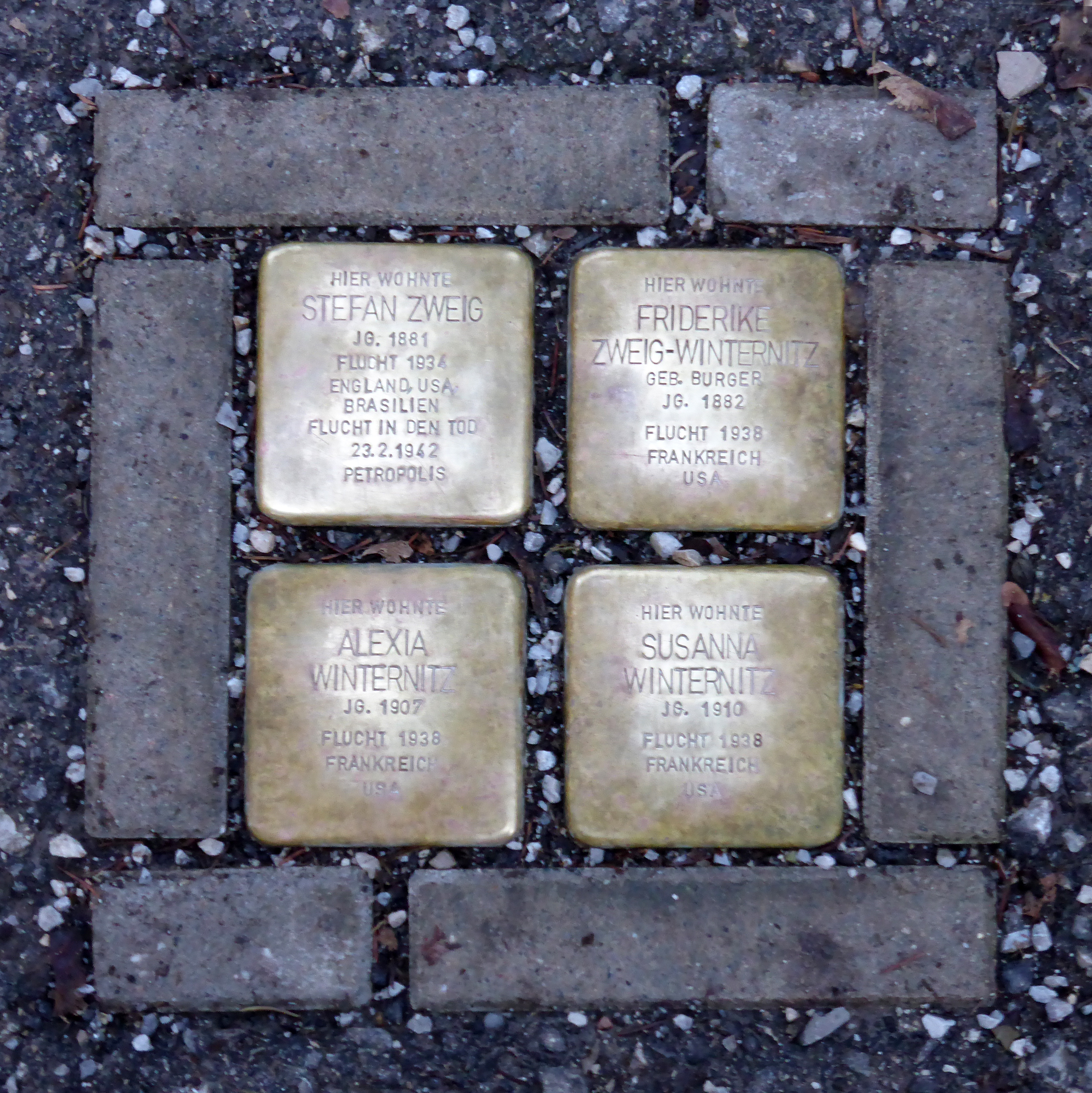
Stolpersteine for Stefan Zweig and relatives at 5 Kapuzinerberg.

The Kapuzinerberg is the location of a Capucines cloister built in 1599–1605 on the site of a medieval fortress, the "Trompeterschlössl". Earliest human settlements on the eastern slope of Kapuzinerberg date back to the Neolithic period. Big prehistoric settlements on mountain date back to 1100 B.C.

On the way of the Linzergasse to the monastery are standing 13 oratories with the way of the cross, which were built up between 1736 and 1744, a memorial place for Wolfgang Amadeus Mozart and the old Paschinger Schlössl, known as the former house of Stefan Zweig. The different old artillery bastions from 1629, which are distributed around the mountain, the military tower of the Felixpforte and the long military walls with their small fortified towers (Auslug) also were built in the time of the Thirty Years' War, and are majority are kept well. On the crest of the mountain, attainable with a drawbridge, there stands the Franziskischlössl. Today it is a small restaurant. Adolf Hitler wanted to establish a gigantic Gauburg, a stadium and a festival house on that mountain. The end of the war forestalled it however and the Kapuzinerberg is still free of intensive land development.

== The cloister ==
The cloister was established by bishop Wolf Dietrich von Raitenau as a stronghold against the Reformation. In 1602, the friars consecrated the first church built on the foundation of a medieval tower. The church inherited a set of 15th century wooden reliefs. Gradually expanding, the cloister reached its present shape around 1690. For centuries, the friars were independent of the local archbishop, subordinate only to the Pope. In 1800 and 1809–10 the cloister was occupied and desecrated by the French troops; in 1813 by the Bavarians. After the Anschluss of 1938 the monks were evicted again, to make way for a Nazi forum, but the project did not materialize. The friars returned in 1942, initially sharing the premises with refugees and prisoners.

== Recreation ==
The mountain is, with its wooded areas, the green lung of Salzburg and offers to the visitors delightful walking possibilities along the many hiking trails, particularly along the Basteiweg, which runs along the fortification walls in the south and the east of the mountain. Also noteworthy are the various views on the historic Altstadt of Salzburg.

The Kapuzinerberg is attainable from the Imbergstiege, from a stone lane beginning in the Franziskuspforte (Linzergasse) or on a footpath behind the Imberg shopping centre in the Fürbergstrasse. Biological features of the mountain are different rare alpine plants and animals in the cold, inaccessible north rocks (alpine auricula and alpine rhododendron, for example). The common raven breeds in the rocks.

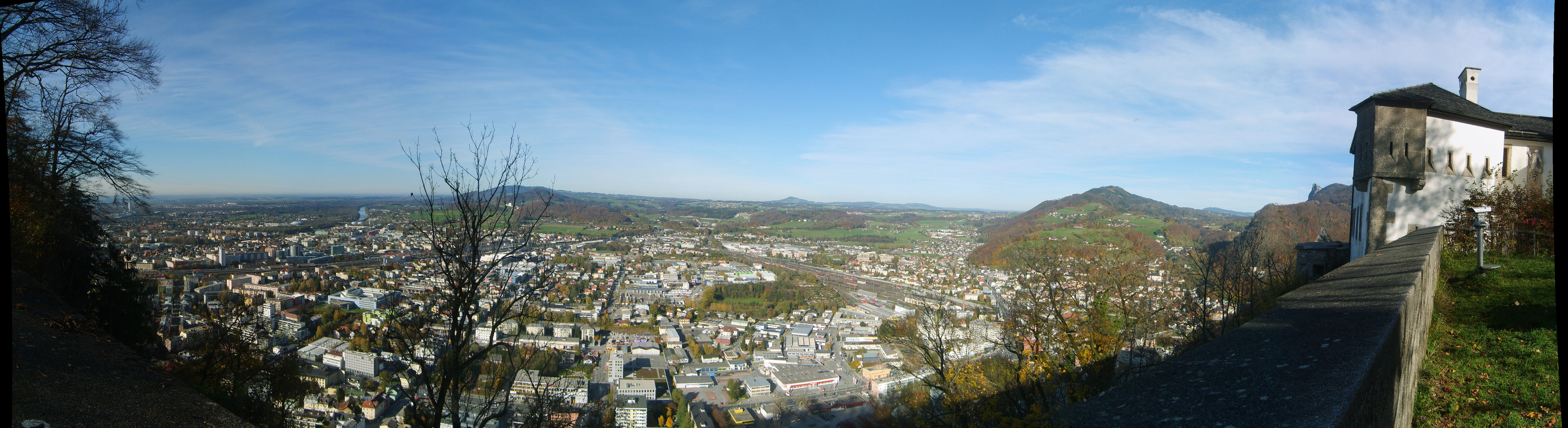
Panorama from the Franziskischlössl, Kapuzinerberg

== See also ==
- Festungsberg

== Literature in german language ==
- Reinhard Medicus: Der Imberg, heute auch Kapuzinerberg genannt, in Natur- und Kulturgeschichte. In: Der Gardist - Jahresschrift der Bürgergarde der Stadt Salzburg, 26. Jahrgang, Salzburg 2006
- Reinhard Medicus: Die einstigen Stadttore der Linzergasse und die Nordfelsen des Kapuzinerberges In: Bastei - Zeitschrift des Stadtvereines Salzburg für die Erhaltung und Pflege von Bauten, Kultur und Gesellschaft, 54. Jahrgang 4. Folge, S.10-16, Salzburg 2005
- Reinhard Medicus: Der Kalvarienberg und die Mozart-Gedenkstätte auf dem Kapuzinerberg In: Bastei - Zeitschrift des Stadtvereines Salzburg, 55. Jahrgang 2. Folge, S. 14–20, Salzburg 2006
- Reinhard Medicus: Die Wehrbauten Paris Lodrons am Kapuzinerberg, 1. Teil und 2. Teil In: Bastei - Zeitschrift des Stadtvereines Salzburg, 58. Jahrgang 1. Folge, S. 11-17 und 2. Folge. Salzburg 2008
- Reinhard Medicus: Gutshöfe und Steinbrüche am Kapuzinerberg In: Bastei - Zeitschrift des Stadtvereines Salzburg, 58. Jahrgang 4. Folge, Salzburg 2008
- Reinhard Medicus: Der Imberg und sein Wasser In: Bastei - Zeitschrift des Stadtvereines Salzburg, 59. Jahrgang 1. Folge, Salzburg 2008
- Reinhard Medicus: Der Kapuzinerberg als Erholungsraum In: Bastei - Zeitschrift des Stadtvereines Salzburg, 60. Jahrgang 3. Folge, S. 11–17, Salzburg 2010
