= Hohenems family =

German noble family

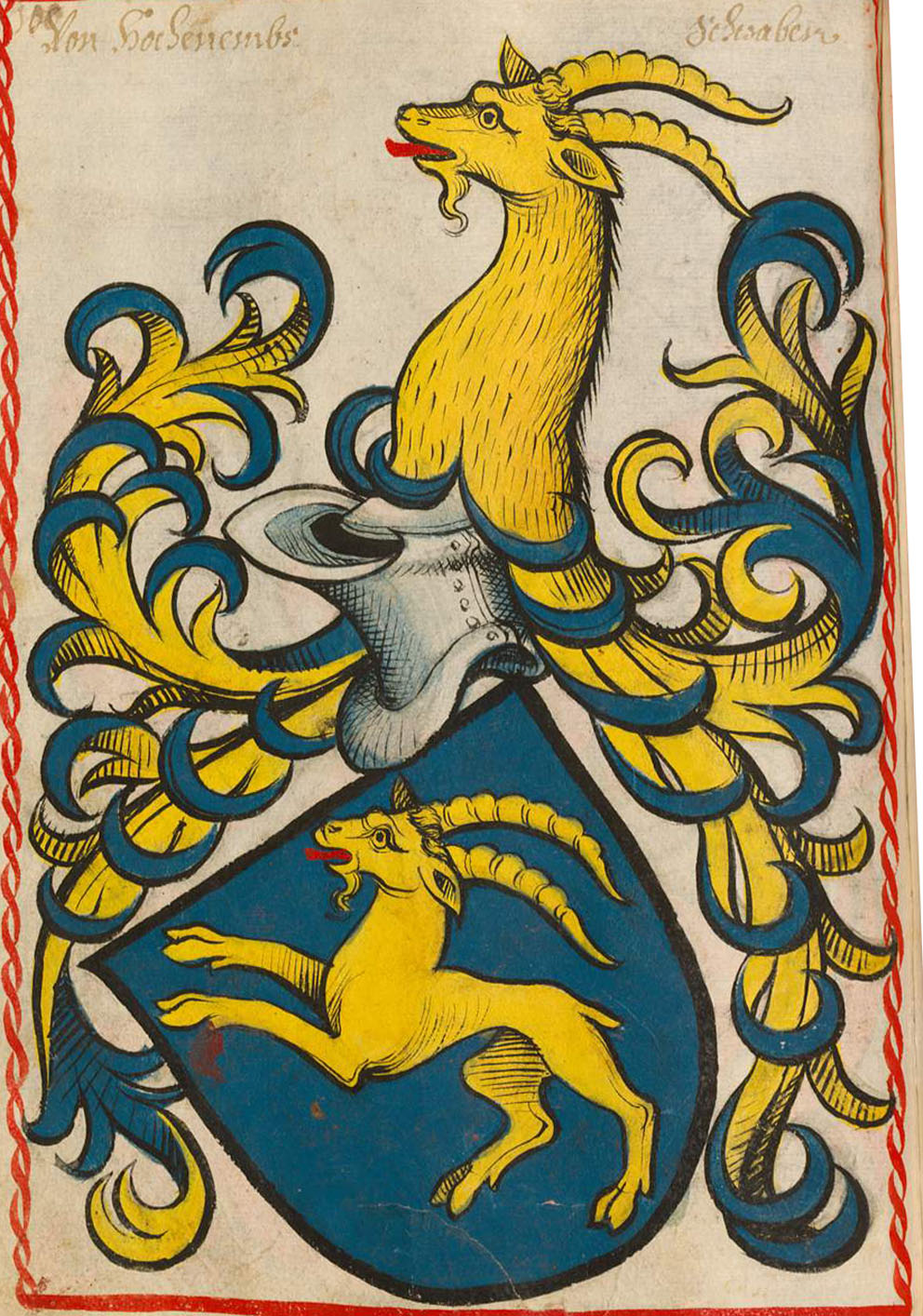
Coat of arms of the Lords of Ems in Scheibler's coat of arms book, 1450

The House of Hohenems, also Lords of Ems (Herren von Ems), were an ancient German noble family in Vorarlberg.

After Giovanni Angelo Medici, was elected Pope Pius IV in 1559, his nephews, the sons of Wolf Dietrich von Hohenems (who was married to the Pope's sister, Clara de Medici) received the Imperial Countship of von Hohenems in 1560. One of the Pope's nephews, Cardinal Mark Sittich von Hohenems (1538–1595), became Bishop of Constance, but resided in Rome. His illegitimate son, Roberto, founded an Italian line, which, under the name Altemps, became Dukes of Gallese, Margraves of Soriano, and Princes of Altemps, and only became extinct in 1964.

The Vorarlberg line acquired the County of Vaduz in 1613 and divided itself into the Imperial Counts of Hohenems-Lustenau and Hohenems-Vaduz in 1646. The Vaduz line was subject to Imperial execution and debt due to abusive witch trials and was forced to sell its County to the Liechtensteins in 1712. The Lustenau line died out in the male line in 1759; its territory fell to Austria, and, in 1790, to the House of Waldburg-Zeil-Hohenems.

== History ==
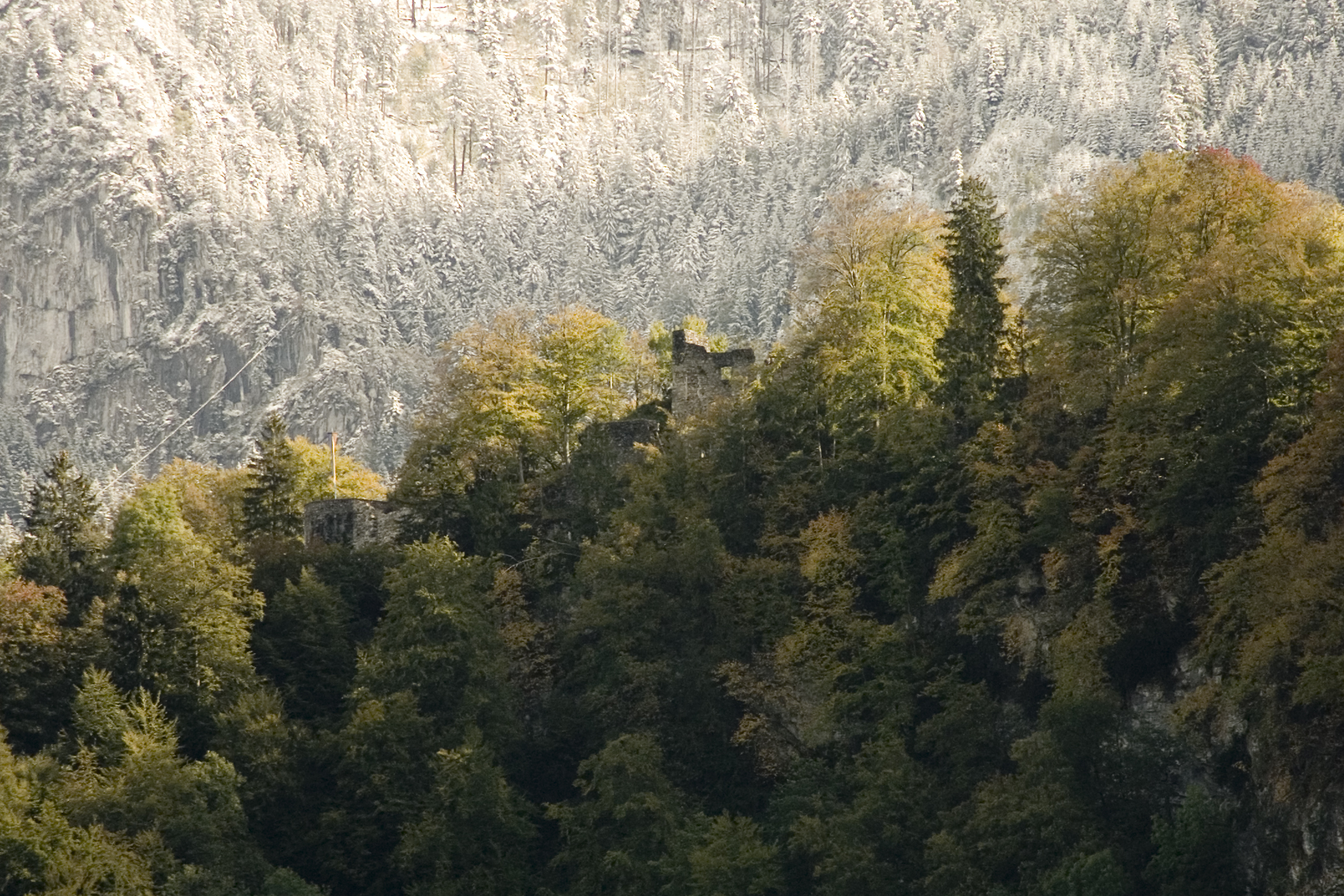
View of the Alt-Ems castle ruins

=== Middle Ages ===
The Lords of Ems were, alongside the Counts of Montfort, the most important noble family in Vorarlberg. The family can be traced back to the year 1170. In 1160, a Hainricus de Amedes (Amides, Ems) is mentioned as a witness in a document. The brothers "Rudolfus et Goswinus de Amides" appear after 1170 as ministeriales of the Hohenstaufen Frederick of Swabia. First Welf, then Hohenstaufen ministeriales, they controlled the Rhine Valley from Vaduz to Lake Constance.

The blinded, castrated William III of Sicily, the last Norman king from the House of Hauteville, was held prisoner in Alt-Ems Castle by the Lords of Ems from 1195 until his death at the age of 13. Between 1206 and 1207, the Archbishop of Cologne, Bruno IV of Sayn, was also held prisoner in Alt-Ems Castle.

The activities of the members of the Ems family in Austrian service led to a rapid rise of the family. Furthermore, the Emsians succeeded in gaining sovereign rights through loans to various emperors and the imperial pledges granted in return. In 1333, Emperor Ludwig the Bavarian granted the town of Ems the rights and freedoms of the Imperial City of Lindau, but the Lords of Ems were never able to implement this. In 1453, the title von Ems was supplemented by the addition of Hohenems.

=== 16th to 18th centuries ===
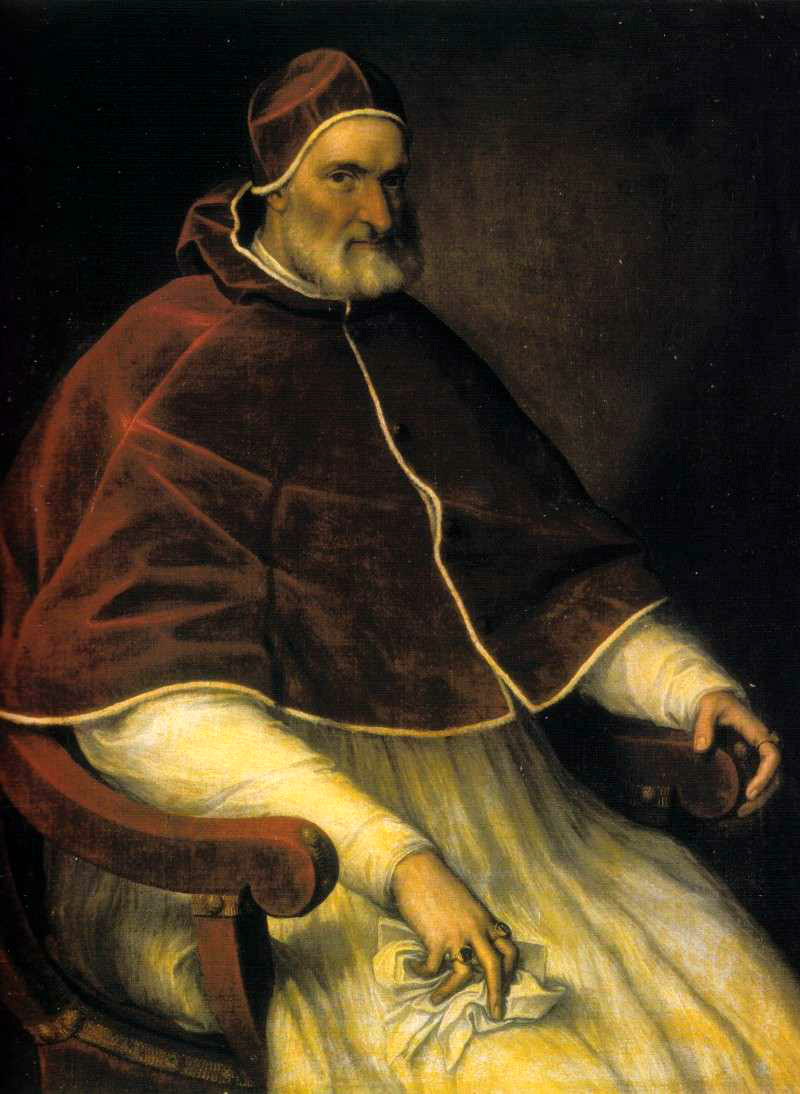
Pope Pius IV

Contrary to the general decline of the knightly nobility in the 16th century, the Lords of Ems succeeded in expanding their rule and rising to the imperial nobility.

Marx Sittich I von Ems (1466–1533) became a Colonel and General of the Swabian League. During campaigns in Italy, around 1530, he succeeded in marrying one of his sons, Wolf-Dietrich (1507–1538), to Clara of the Milanese Medici di Marignano family, whose brother, Gian Giacomo "Il Mendeghino" (d. 1555), was a condottiere and whose other brother, Giovanni Angelo, was a cardinal. The latter adopted the name and coat of arms of the (unrelated) Florentine Medici family and was elected Pope Pius IV in 1559. He immediately endowed his numerous Italian and German nephews with benefices to secure his power. As early as 27 April 1560, Wolf-Dietrich's sons (Jakob Hannibal, the later Cardinal Marx Sittich III and Gabriel) and their cousin Marx Sittich II were elevated to the rank of Imperial Count by the Emperor.

Markus Sittikus von Hohenems was created a Cardinal by his papal uncle in 1561 and promoted to Governor of the March of Ancona. From 1561 to 1589 he served as Bishop of Constance and then at the Curia in Rome. Markus Sittikus' brother Jakob Hannibal I von Hohenems became general in the troops of Charles V and Philip II. His cousins were the Milanese Cardinal Charles Borromeo and Cardinal Federico Borromeo, and his nephews were Wolf Dietrich von Raitenau, who later became Prince-Archbishop of Salzburg from 1587 to 1612, and Markus Sittikus IV von Hohenems (youngest son of Jakob Hannibal), who also rose to become Prince-Archbishop of Salzburg from 1612 to 1619.

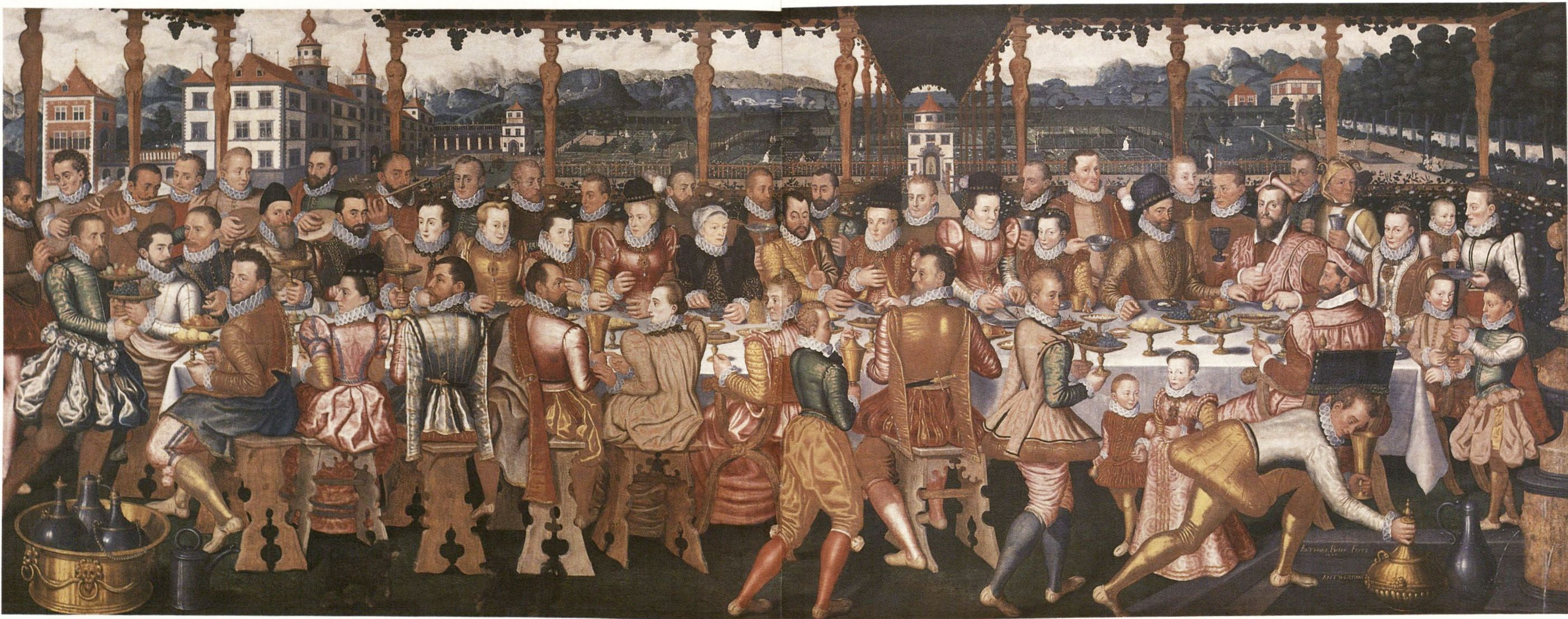
Banquet of the Hohenems family, by Anton Boys, 1578

In 1613, Count Kaspar von Hohenems acquired the County of Vaduz and the Lordship of Schellenberg from the Counts of Sulz. The Imperial Lordships of Hohenems-Lustenau and Hohenems-Vaduz were created in 1646. The Lordship of Hohenems included the castles of Alt-Ems (since c. 1240) and Neu-Ems (since 1343), the Oberdorfer Thurn (since 1465) in Dornbirn, and Vaduz Castle (since 1613). The towns of Dornbirn, Widnau-Haslach, since 1578 the County of Gallara near Milan, the County of Vaduz and Lordship of Schellenberg since 1613 (from which Liechtenstein emerged in 1699 and 1712), the Lordships of Lustenau in Vorarlberg, Widnau in Switzerland as well as Polička, Bonna, Trepien, Laubendorf and Bistrau in Bohemia.

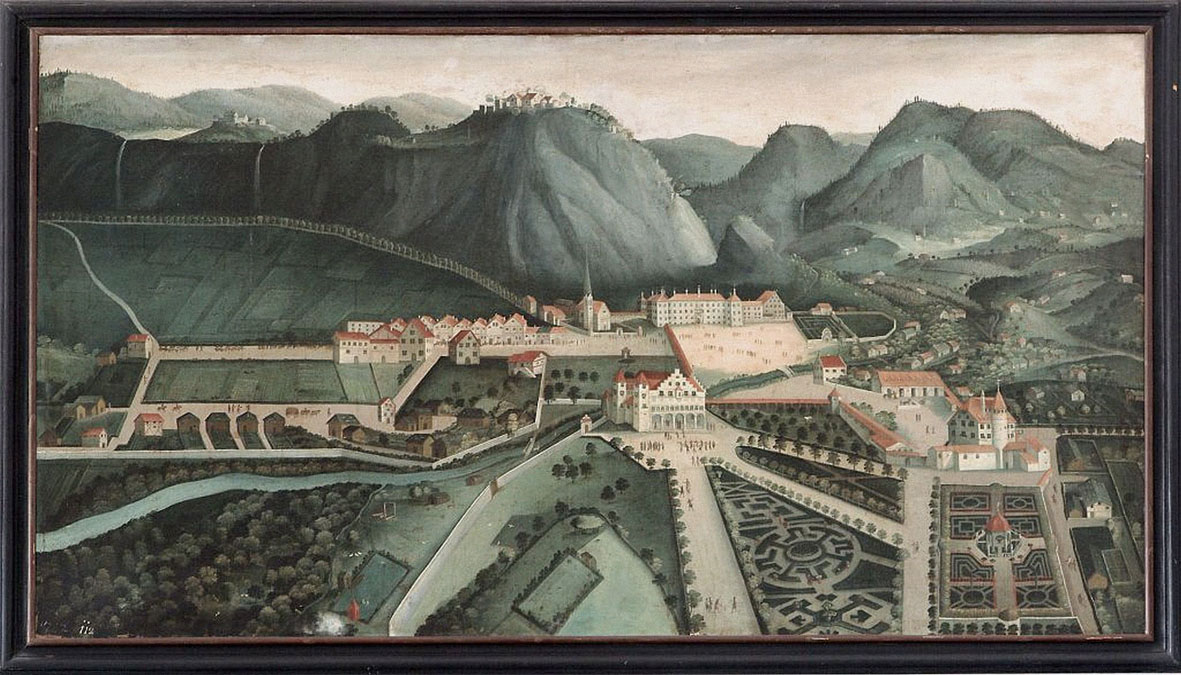
Hohenems (early 17th century)

Due to years of excessive witch hunts and the unlawful appropriation of the assets of those executed, the Imperial execution was initiated against the reigning Count Ferdinand Karl von Hohenems-Vaduz (1650–1686) in 1681. The Count was arrested by Imperial order in 1683, lost his sovereign power by decree of the Imperial Court Council in 1684, and was simultaneously obliged to return the confiscated property to his surviving relatives. Since the heavily indebted Count's house was unable to do this, Ferdinand Karl's successor, his brother Jakob Hannibal III von Hohenems (1653–1730), again placed the estate under compulsory administration. In 1699, the estate of Schellenberg was sold, and in 1712, the County of Vaduz was also sold to Hans-Adam I, Prince of Liechtenstein.

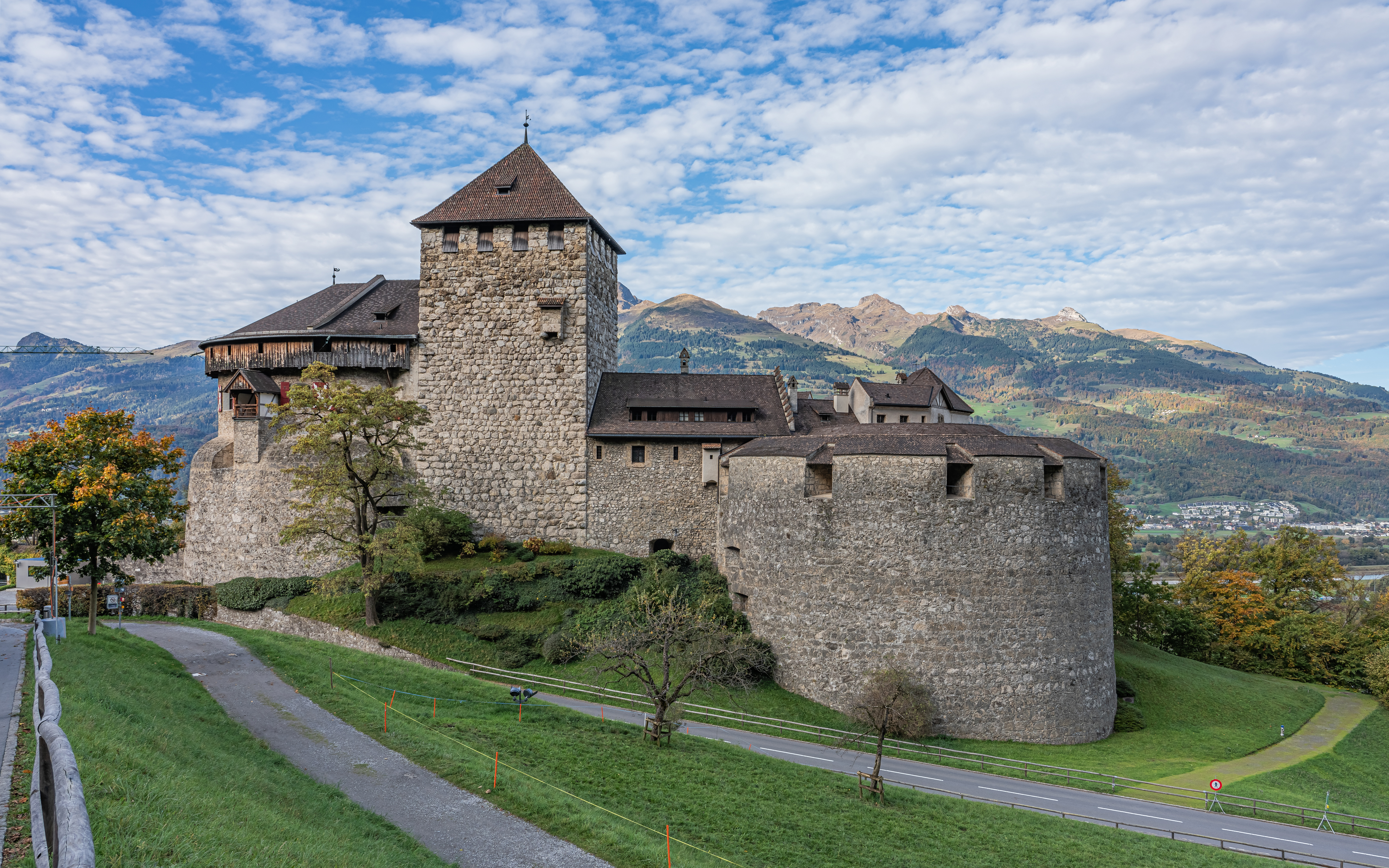
Vaduz Castle

In 1759, with Franz Wilhelm III, the male line of the Counts of Hohenems-Lustenau died out and sovereignty passed to Austria.

=== Waldburg-Zeil-Hohenems ===
Maria Rebecca, Countess von Harrach-Hohenems regained the Lordship of Lustenau following a treaty with Austria in 1790. Her daughter, Maria Walburga von Harrach, married Clemens Alois von Waldburg-Zeil-Hohenems (1753–1817). The sovereign state of Lustenau under the ruling Counts of Waldburg-Zeil-Lustenau-Hohenems only fell to the Kingdom of Bavaria after the end of the Holy Roman Empire in 1806.

The Hohenems Palace

In 1811 and 1813, Bavaria was forced to cede its sovereign rights back to the House of Waldburg-Zeil-Hohenems. In 1814, Austria established a provisional administration in Lustenau. Bavaria, like Waldburg-Zeil, protested. In 1817, Lustenau again passed to Waldburg-Zeil. In view of financial burdens and the resulting renunciation of sovereignty by Count Maximilian (1799–1868), Lustenau's sovereignty was finally transferred to Austria in 1830.

The present head of this line of the family is Count Franz Josef von Waldburg-Zeil-Hohenems (b. 1962).

=== Altemps ===
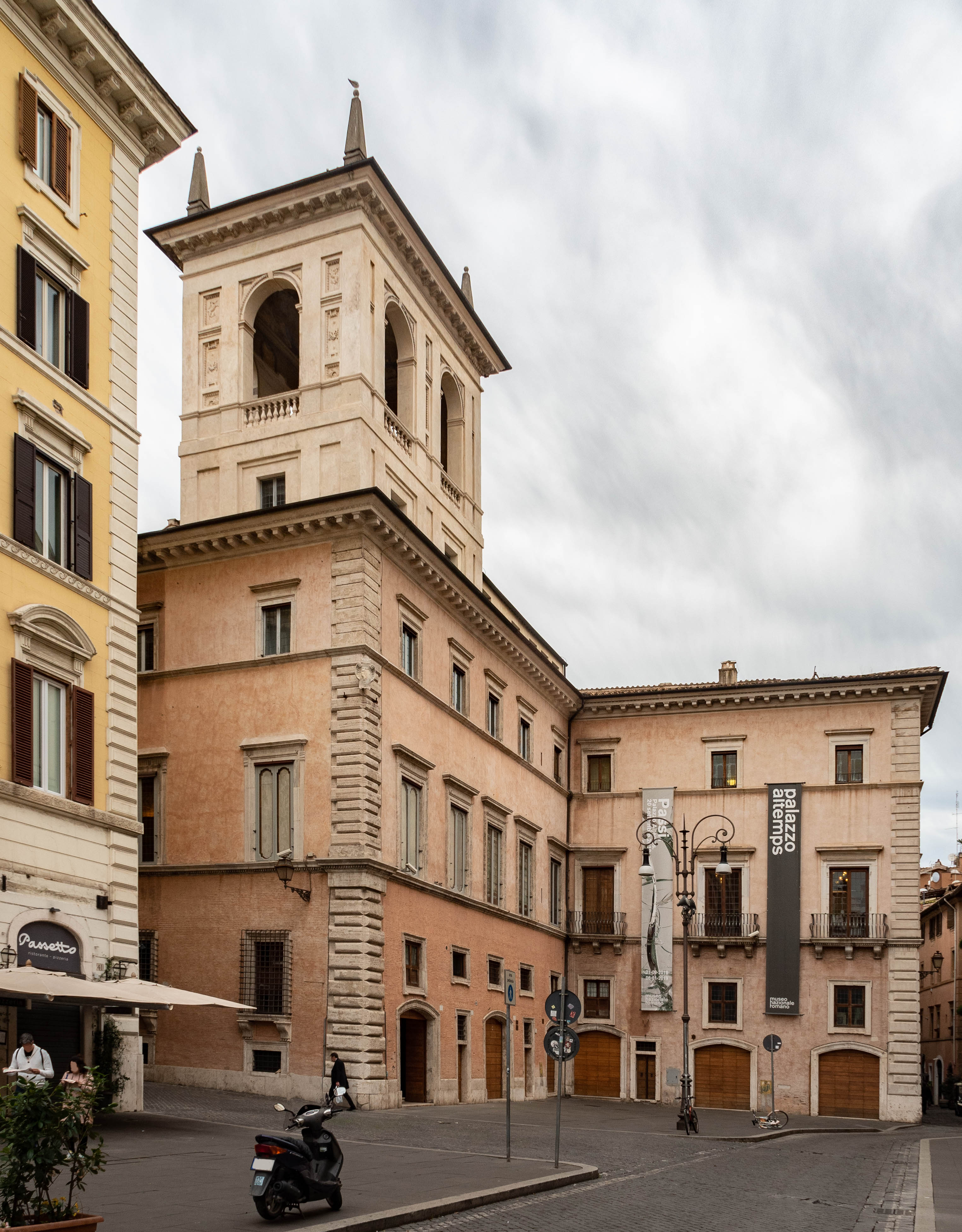
Palazzo Altemps in Rome

The Prince-Bishop of Constance and, later, Cardinal of the Curia, Markus Sittikus von Hohenems, acquired the Palazzo Riario (afterwards called Palazzo Altemps) in Rome in 1568 and housed his collection of antiquities there, which later came to be housed in the Vatican Museums. One of the cardinal's natural sons, Roberto Altemps (c. 1566–1586), who Latinized the name Hohenems to Altemps, (Note: The addition of Altemps to the family name reflects Alt-Ems (or Alt-Embs) itself deriving from "Alta Embs" (Latin for "altus" for high), like the modern name Hohenems (High Ems in German).) was appointed commander of the papal troops in Avignon and Duke of Gallese under Pope Sixtus V at a young age. However, when he married Cornelia Orsini, whose family was one of the Pope's fiercest enemies, the Pope had him beheaded at the age of only 20 for alleged adultery.

His descendants formed the Italian Princely House of Altemps (not to be confused with the Austrian Counts of Attems, who were of Italian descent). The Italian line only died out in the male line in 1964 with Don Duke Alessandro Altemps. The titles Duke of Altemps (Duca di Altemps), Marquess of Soriano (Marchese di Soriano), Count of Meduraca (Conte di Meduraca), and Lord of Tassignano (Signore di Tassignano) passed to his grandson, Prince Don Alessandro Boncompagni-Ludovisi-Rondinelli-Vitelli-Altemps (b. 1972).

== Notable members ==
- Rudolf von Ems (c. 1200–1254), poet.
- Ulrich I von Ems, a Knight who built Neu-Ems Castle in 1343.
- Ulrich II von Ems, the Rich, a Knight who bought the Church and Widum in Dornbirn from Ludwig, Abbot of Weingartner, in 1388.
- Osanna von Ems (d. c. 1418), granddaughter of the Knight Ulrich I von Ems and a daughter of the noble Schellenberg family, wife of the Sigmund von Starkenberg (d. 1401). After his death, she acted as guardian of her sons Ulrich von Starkenberg and Wilhelm von Starkenberg.
- Marx Sittich I von Ems (1466–1533), General of the Swabian League, he defeated the rebellious peasants on Lake Constance in the Peasants' War of 1525. He also fought alongside the Squire leader Frundsberg and Truchsess Georg von Waldburg ("Bauernjörg") in the Swabian Wars and in northern Italy. During his campaigns in Italy, he succeeded in marrying one of his sons, Wolf-Dietrich, to a sister of the future Pope Pius IV. This marked the beginning of a rapid rise in the Ems family's power and family politics.
- Georg Sigmund von Ems (1494–1547), Canon of Constance, a son of Merk Sittich I, was chosen by King Ferdinand I as a candidate for the Bishopric of Constance in 1532
- Wolf-Dietrich von Ems (1507–1538), married Clara de Medici, sister of Pope Pius IV.
- Jakob Hannibal I von Hohenems (1530–1587), Imperial Count of Hohenems, leader of the Papal Troops, later Papal legate
- Mark Sittich von Hohenems Altemps (1533–1595), Bishop of Cassano and Konstanz, and Cardinal, builder of the Palazzo Altemps in Rome and the Villa Mondragone
- Kaspar von Hohenems (1573–1640), Imperial Count of Hohenems, commissioner of the Ems Chronicle
- Markus Sittich von Hohenems (1574–1619), Prince-Archbishop of Salzburg, builder of Hellbrunn Palace in Salzburg
- Jakob Hannibal II von Hohenems (1595–1646), military leader in the Thirty Years' War
- Ferdinand Karl von Hohenems (1650–1686), responsible for witch trials in Liechtenstein.
- Jakob Hannibal III von Hohenems (1653–1730), sold the Lordships of Schellenberg (1699) and Count of Vaduz (1712) to the House of Liechtenstein
- Franz Rudolph von Hohenems (1686–1756), Imperial Field Marshal and General of the Cavalry
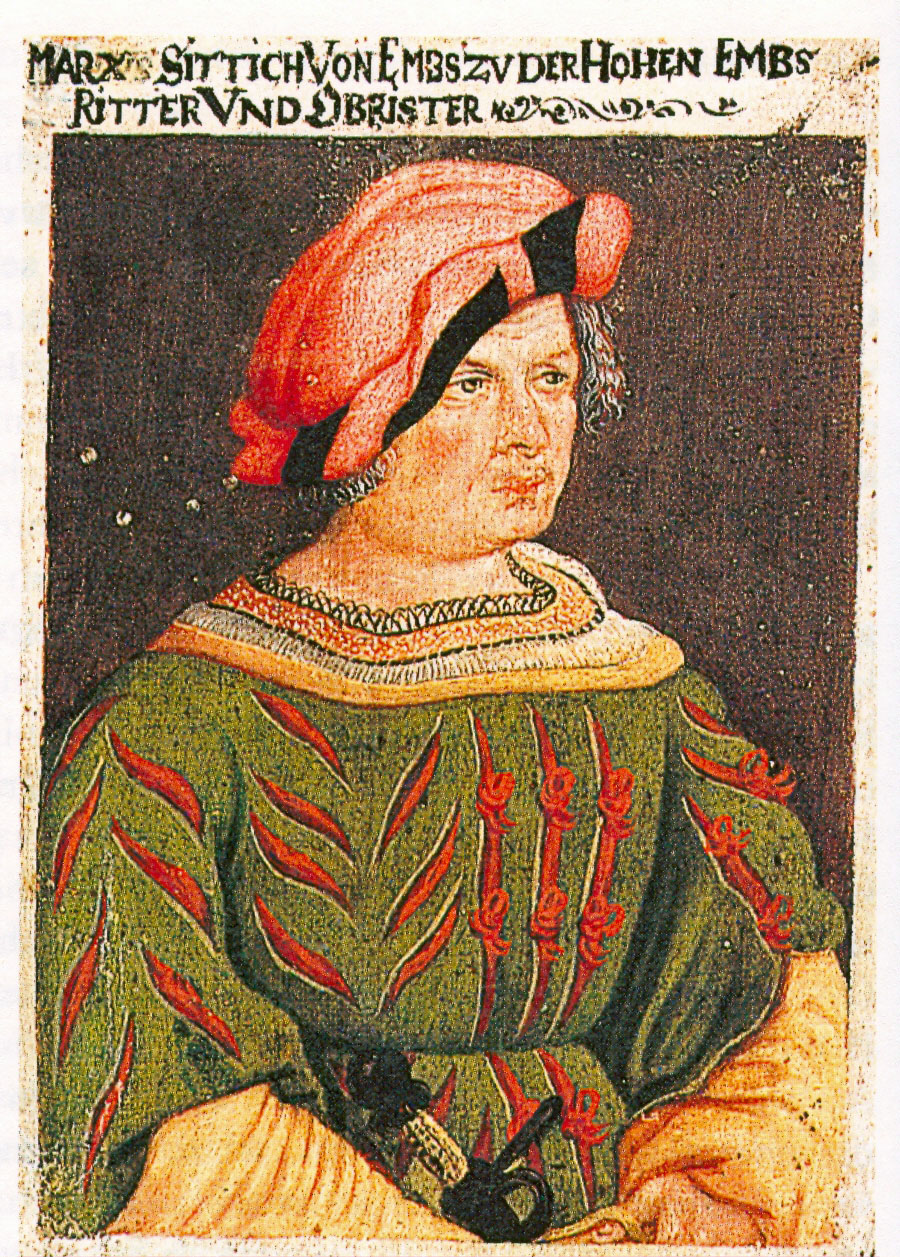
Marx Sittich von Ems (1466–1533), General of the Swabian League

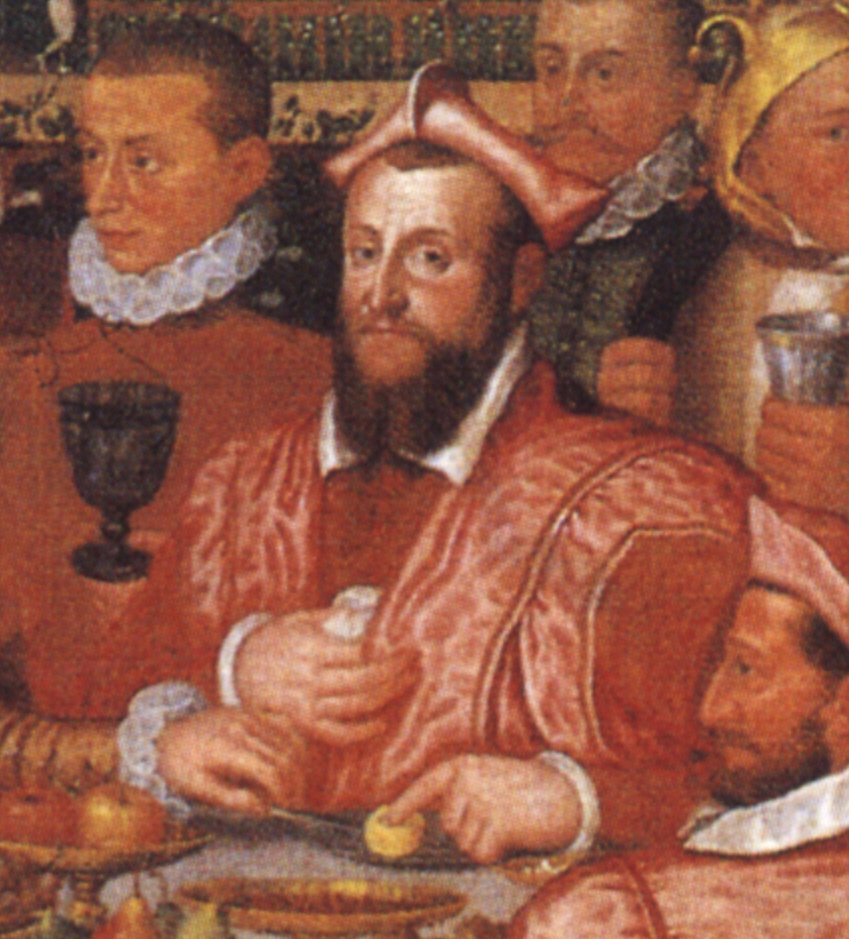
Cardinal Mark Sittich von Hohenems (1533–1595), Bishop of Constance

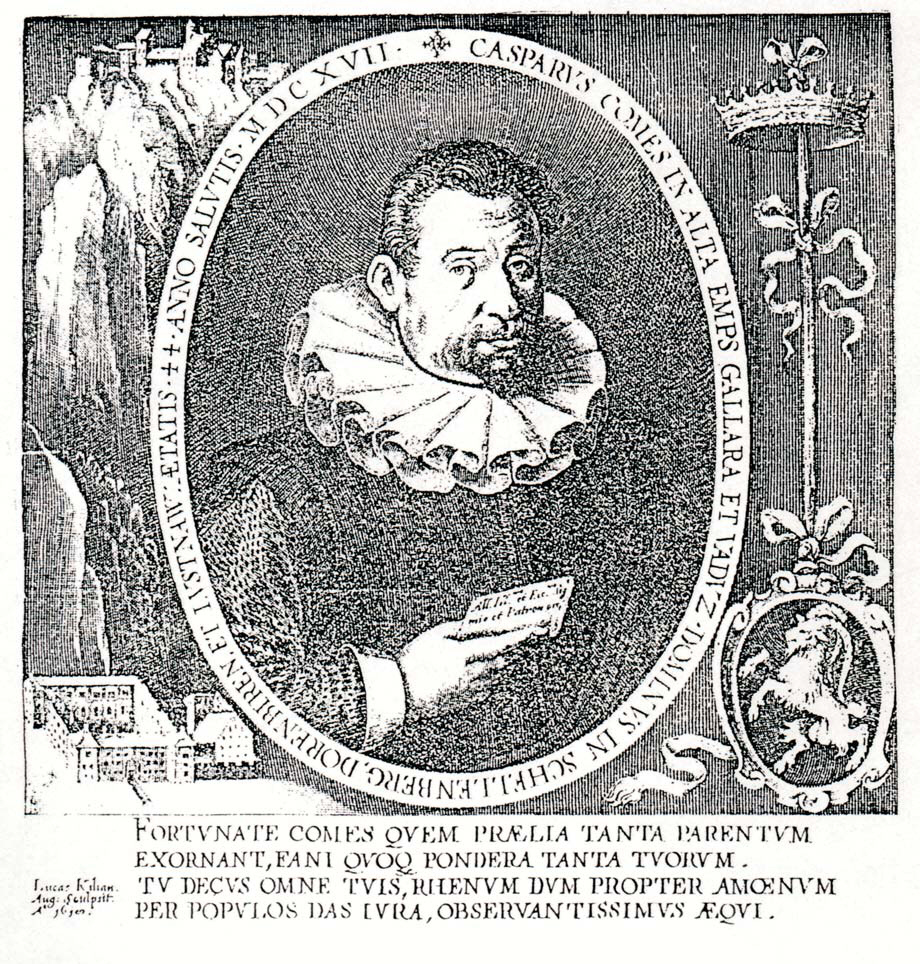
Imperial Count Kaspar von Hohenems (1573–1640)

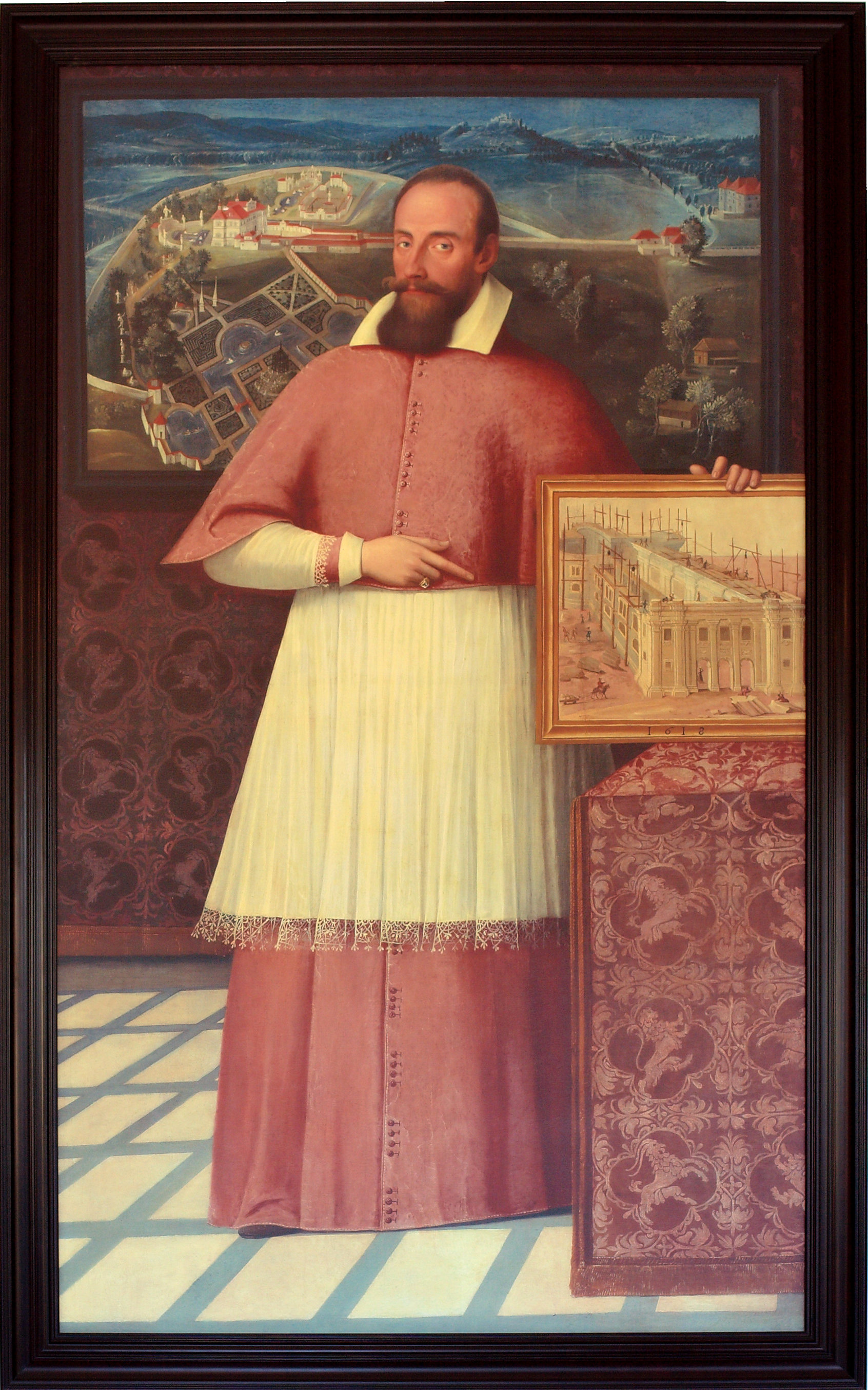
Markus Sittich von Hohenems (1574–1619), Prince-Archbishop of Salzburg

== Castles and palaces ==
=== Alt-Ems Castle ===
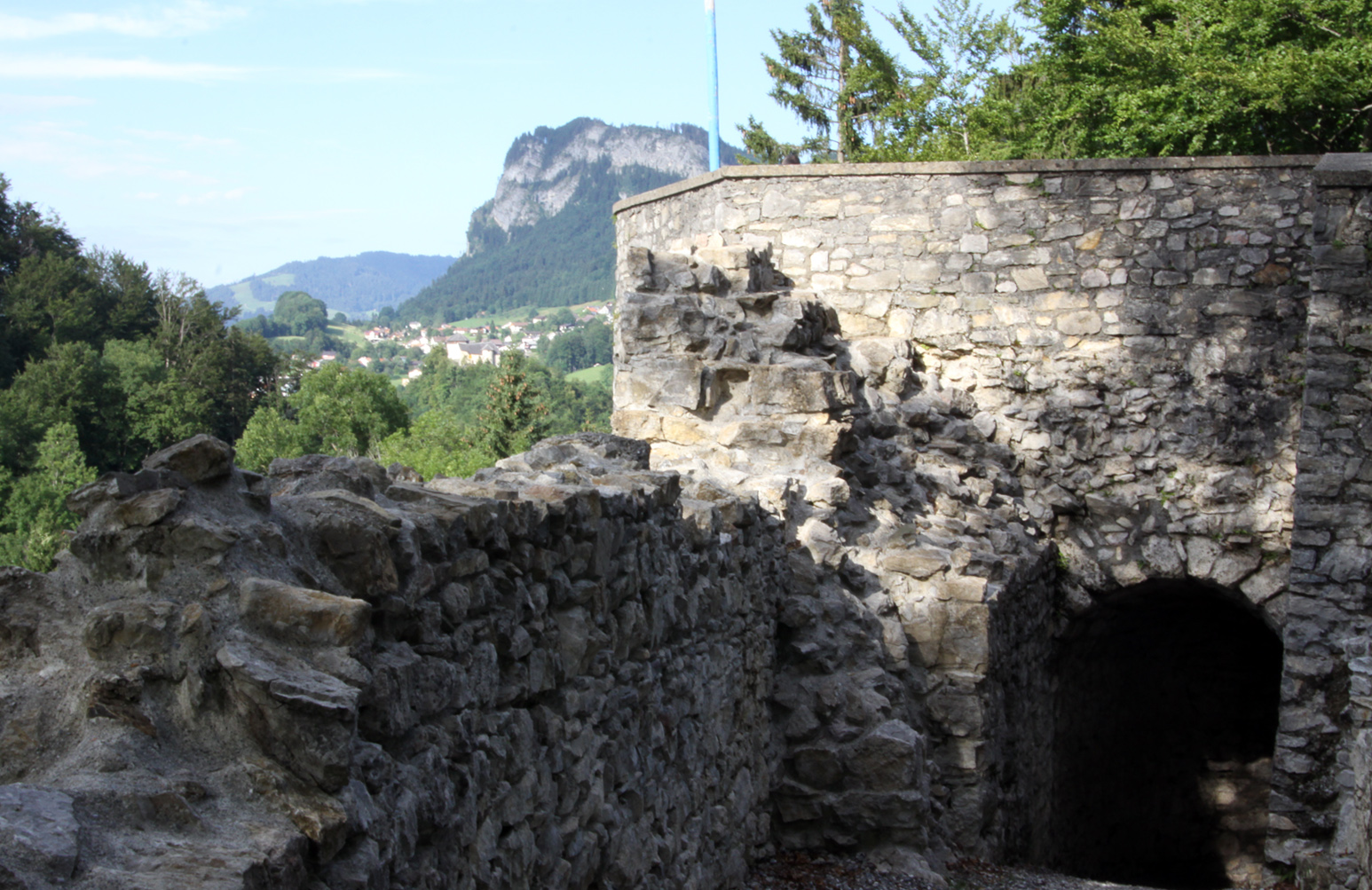
Alt-Ems Castle ruins

This castle complex is near Hohenems in Vorarlberg, and was located at an altitude of 740 metres above sea level, about 300 metres above the Rhine Valley on the vertically rising rocky ridge.

Originally a Welf castle, and from 1179/1191 a Hohenstaufen castle, it was owned by the ministeriales of Ems. From the end of the 12th century, Alt-Ems Castle was one of the most powerful and largest castle complexes in all of southern Germany. The Hohenstaufen fortress served, among other things, as a detention center for prominent prisoners, such as William III of Sicily from 1195 onward and the Archbishop of Cologne Bruno von Sayn in 1206.

In 1406 the castle complex was destroyed in the Appenzell Wars.

=== Neu-Ems Castle (Glopper Castle) ===
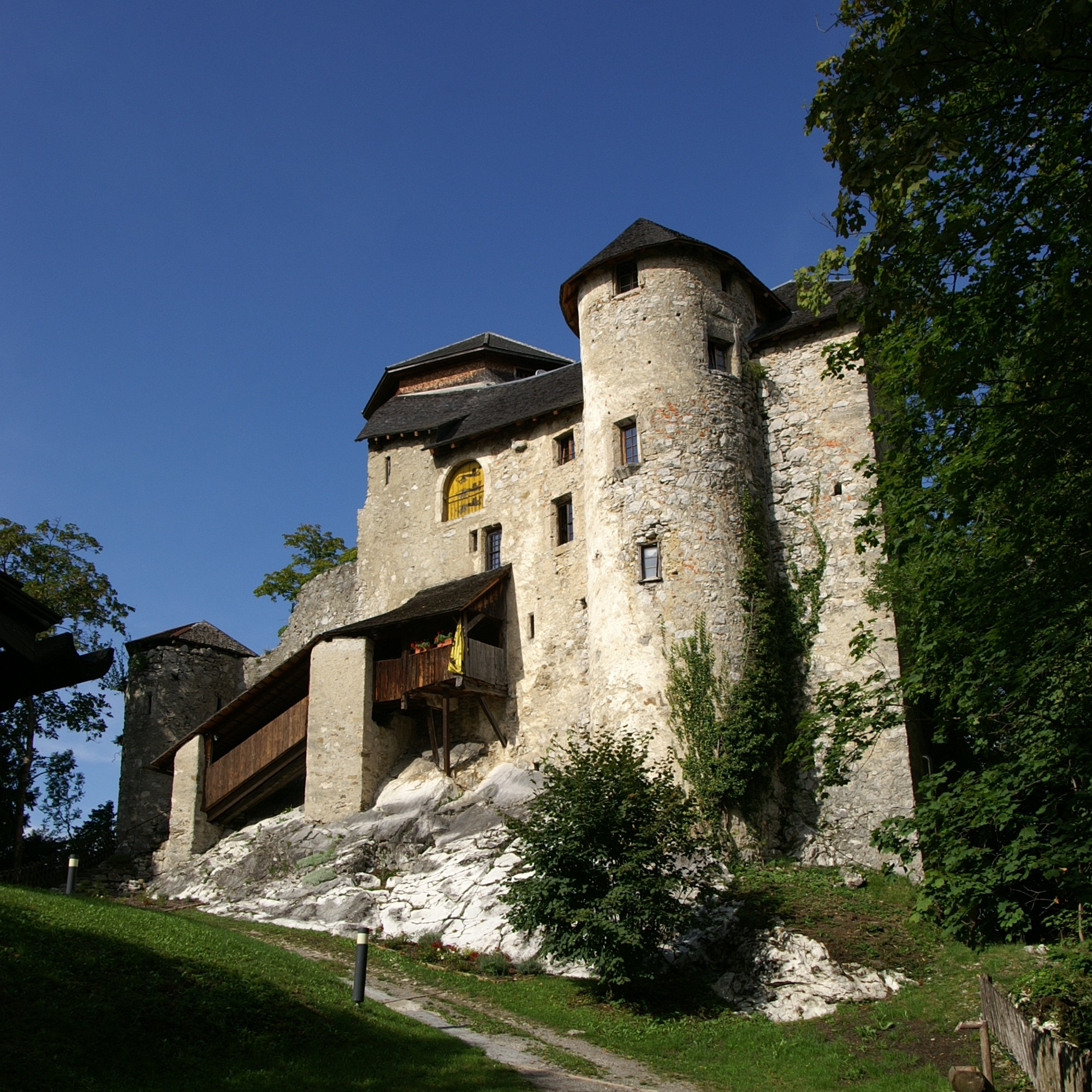
Neu-Ems Castle

In 1343, with the permission of Emperor Louis IV the Bavarian, Knight Ulrich I von Ems built a new castle on the ridge of the Rhine Valley in Emsreute, near his fortress Alt-Ems, to provide a secure haven for his large family during turbulent times. In 1407, during the Appenzell Wars, the castle of the former Counts of Hohenems was destroyed for the first time and immediately rebuilt.

In 1603, a chapel was established on the ground floor, of which, apart from two pointed-arch windows in the north wall, nothing remains today. The former winged altarpiece of this chapel has been in the Tyrolean State Museum in Innsbruck since 1835. Since 1843, this exceptionally homogeneous ensemble of buildings, consisting of a small-scale stronghold with a keep-like bulwark, an attached palace, and a lower-lying outer bailey, has been privately owned by the Waldburg-Zeil family.

=== Hohenems Palace ===
Hohenems Palace

Hohenems Palace was built between 1562 and 1567 in the valley below Alt-Ems Castle and was the residence of the Counts of Hohenems. The Renaissance palace was commissioned by Cardinal Mark Sittich von Hohenems (1533–1595), son of Wolf Dietrich and Chiara de Medici. The palace was expanded at the beginning of the 17th century, by a nephew of Mark Sittich, Count Kaspar von Hohenems (1573–1640). After the death of the last ruling Imperial Count of Hohenems, Franz Wilhelm III, in 1759, his daughter Maria Rebecca (1742–1806) inherited the property. She was married to the Imperial and Royal Field Marshal Franz Xaver, Count Harrach-Rohrau-Kunewald (1732–1781). Their only daughter, Maria Walburga, Hereditary Countess Harrach-Lustenau-Hohenems (1762–1828), married Clemens Alois, Imperial Hereditary Truchsess, Count Waldburg-Zeil-Trauchburg, in 1779. They became ruling Counts of Lustenau in 1806.

Today, the palace is privately owned by the descendants of the Waldburg-Zeil-Hohenems family.
