= Anton Boys =

Painter, draughtsman and printmaker from Antwerp, Habsburg Netherlands

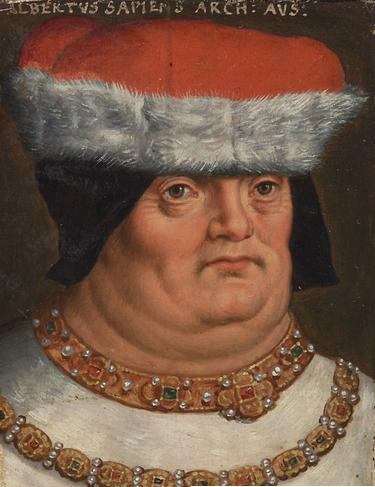
Albert II of Austria

Anton Boys or Anton Waiss (born between 1530 and 1550 – died after 1593) was a Flemish painter, draughtsman and printmaker who after training in Antwerp had an international career, which brought him to Italy, Spain, Prague, Innsbruck and Landshut.

He was court painter to Archduke Ferdinand II of Austria for whom he realised a series of contemporary and historical portraits of members of the imperial House of Habsburg. Many of these portraits are in the collection of the Kunsthistorisches Museum. Boys was also an important witness and illustrator of key events in the life of the Habsburgs: he made the engravings for a book describing celebrations on the occasion of the grant of the Order of the Golden Fleece to leading Imperial court members and created an almost life-size depiction of a wedding banquet of a powerful aristocratic family in the service of the Imperial family.

== Life ==
The artist was born in Antwerp, which was at the time located in the Habsburg Netherlands. The date of his birth is not known and estimates vary from c. 1530 to c. 1550. In 1572, he became a free master in the Antwerp Guild of Saint Luke.

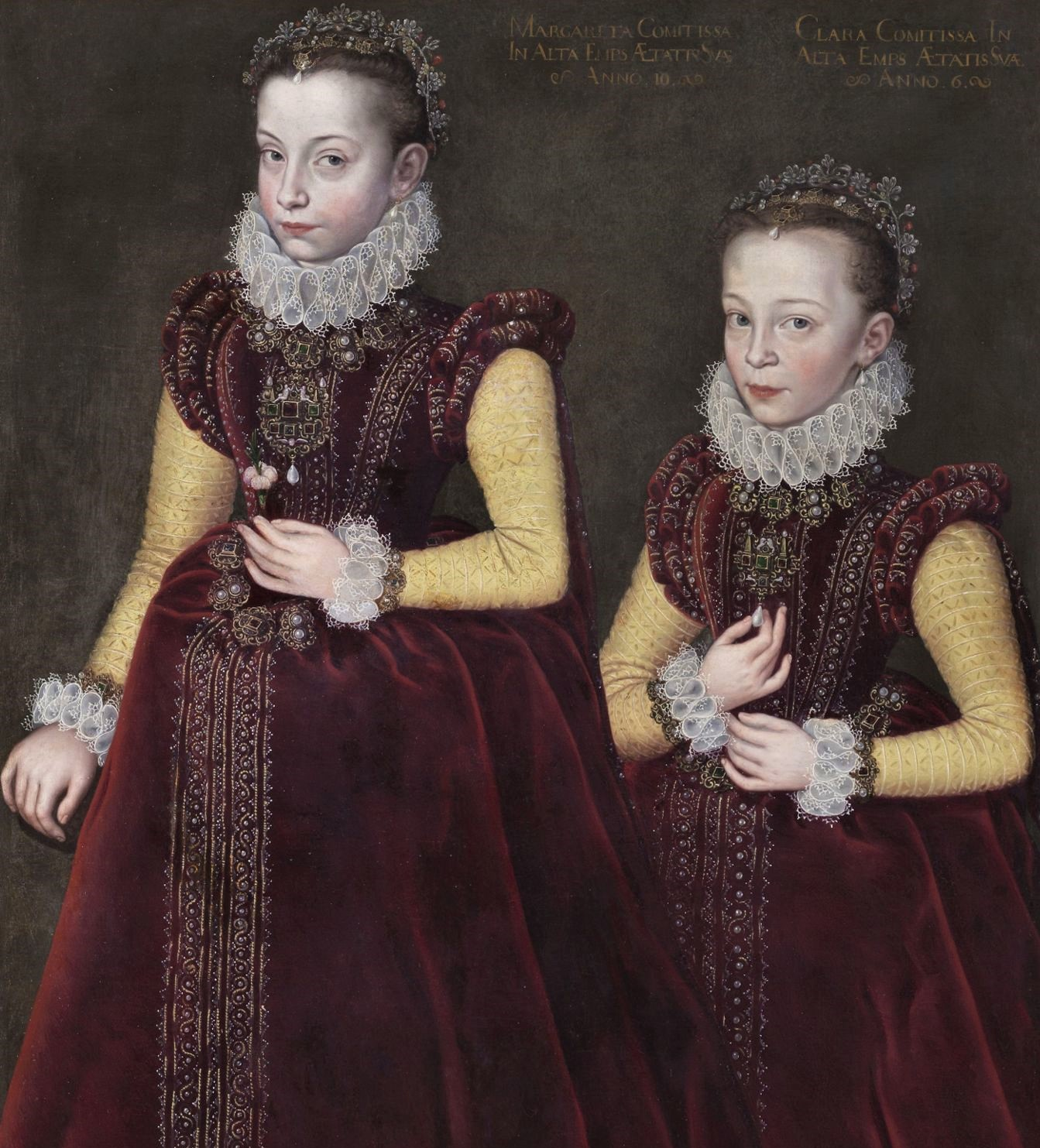
Margarete and Clara von Hohenems

In the period from 1574 to 1576 he is believed to have traveled to Italy and Spain. Around 1575 the artist was employed by Count Jakob Hannibal I von Hohenems as a court painter. In the period from 1579 to 1593 the artist is recorded as being active in Prague, Innsbruck and Landshut. He was appointed in 1579 as court painter to Archduke Ferdinand II of Austria and at the same time received 320 guilders for one of his works. It is around this time that the artist starts using the Germanised form of his name 'Anthoni (Anton) Waiss'.

In 1580 Boys received a grant of arms, which conferred on him the right to bear a coat of arms or armorial bearings. He is mentioned twice as court painter in Innsbruck (in 1584 and 1586). In particular it is recorded that in 1584 he received the large sum of 1060 florins, which points to a significant activity of the artist.

He married in 1587 with Barbara Geiger from Innsbruck and established a foundation for the poor in 1589 with a donation of 100 guilders. A record from 1589 refers to the deterioration of the health of Anton Boys and the need to find a new court painter.

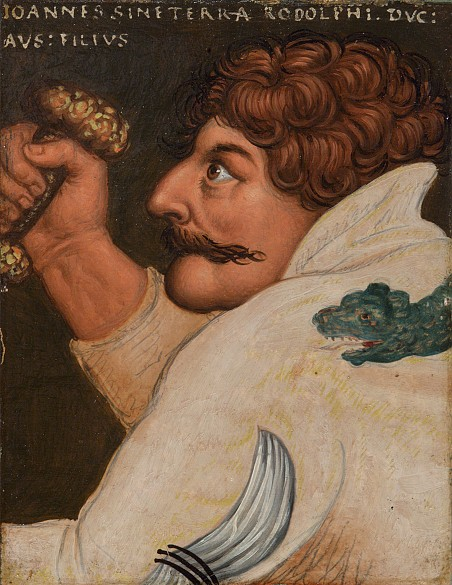
John Parricida

It is not known when or where the artist died. Estimates place his time of death between 1593 and 1603.

== Work ==
=== Portrait painter ===
Anton Boys' role as a court painter appears to have been to paint portraits of historical and living members of branches of the imperial family and their consorts. He painted portraits of Count Jakob Hannibal I von Hohenhems and his family. He also worked on a series of Ahnenbilder (portraits of ancestors) for Count Jakob Hannibal I von Hohenhems. His portraits were made after older originals, which explains the rather archaic style of these works. Many of these miniature portraits are now in the collection of the Kunsthistorisches Museum in Vienna. He later made a similar series of ancestor portraits for Archduke Ferdinand II.

=== The Ordentliche Beschreibung ===
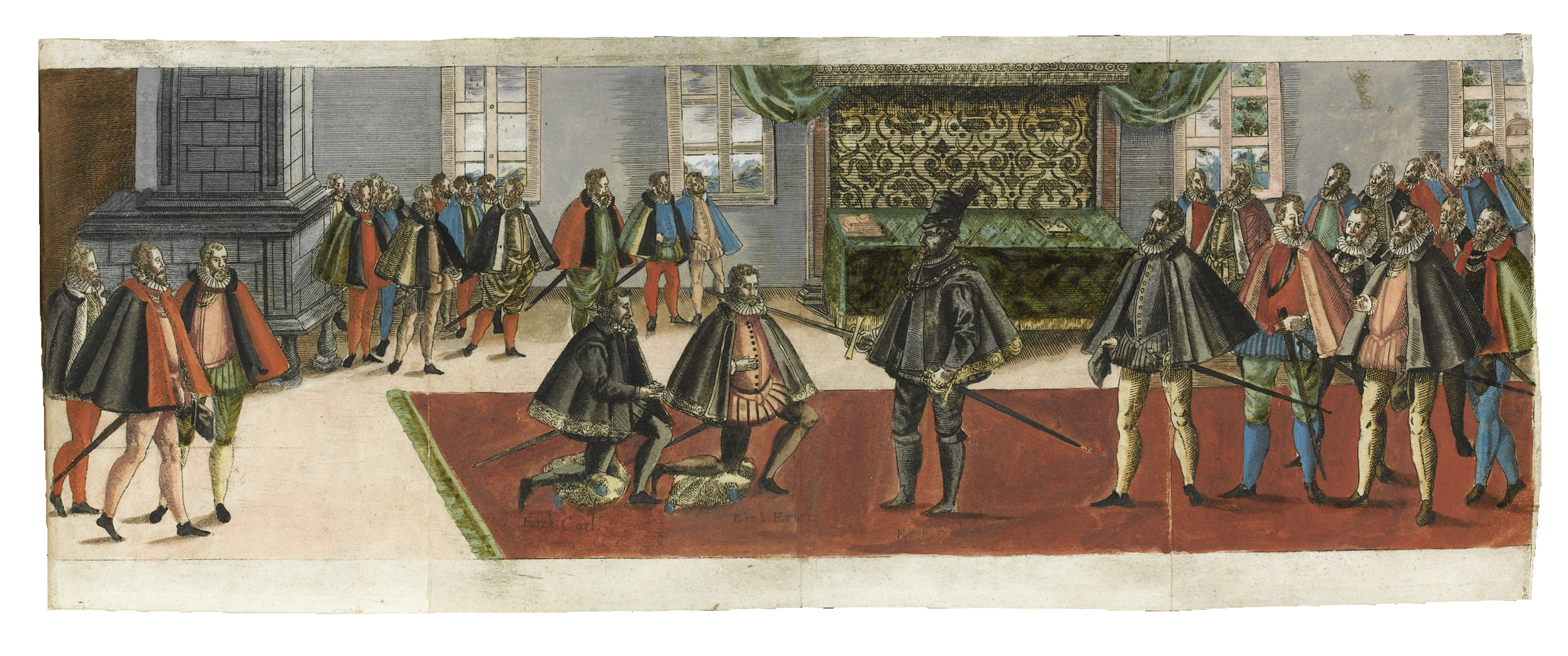
A knighting from the Ordentliche Beschreibung

Boys is believed to have been the author of the engravings illustrating a book that appeared in 1587 in Dillingen an der Donau. The full title of the book is Ordentliche Beschreibung mit was stattlichen Ceremonien und Zierlichheiten die Röm. Kay. May. unser aller gnedigster Herr sampt etlich andlern Erzherzogen, Fürsten und Herrn, den Orden dess Guldin Flüss in disem 85. Jahr zu Prag und Landshüt empfangen und angenommen: neben vorgehender Summarischer Außführung vnd Erinnerung, was von disem Orden, auch dessen vrsprung vnd bedeutung fürnemlich züwissen. Dabey dann auch ettliche zu diser Beschreibung dienstliche fine Figuren zu sehen ('Orderly description of the stately ceremonies and elegant events with which the Holy Roman Emperor, our most gracious Lord, together with several other Archdukes, Princes and Noblemen, received and accepted the Order of the Golden Fleece, in the course of this 85th year, at Prague and Landshut, (and) in addition to the foregoing explanation and remembrance, what should be mainly known about the origins and meaning of this Order. And also many fine figures that are useful for this description can be seen').

The book was written by Paul Zehendter von Zehendtgrueb, the secretary of Archduke Ferdinand of Austria. It provides a detailed description of the ceremonies and festivities held in Prague and Landshut on the occasion of the grant of the Order of the Golden Fleece to Emperor Rudolph II, the Archdukes Karl and Ernst, and some other princes and noblemen.

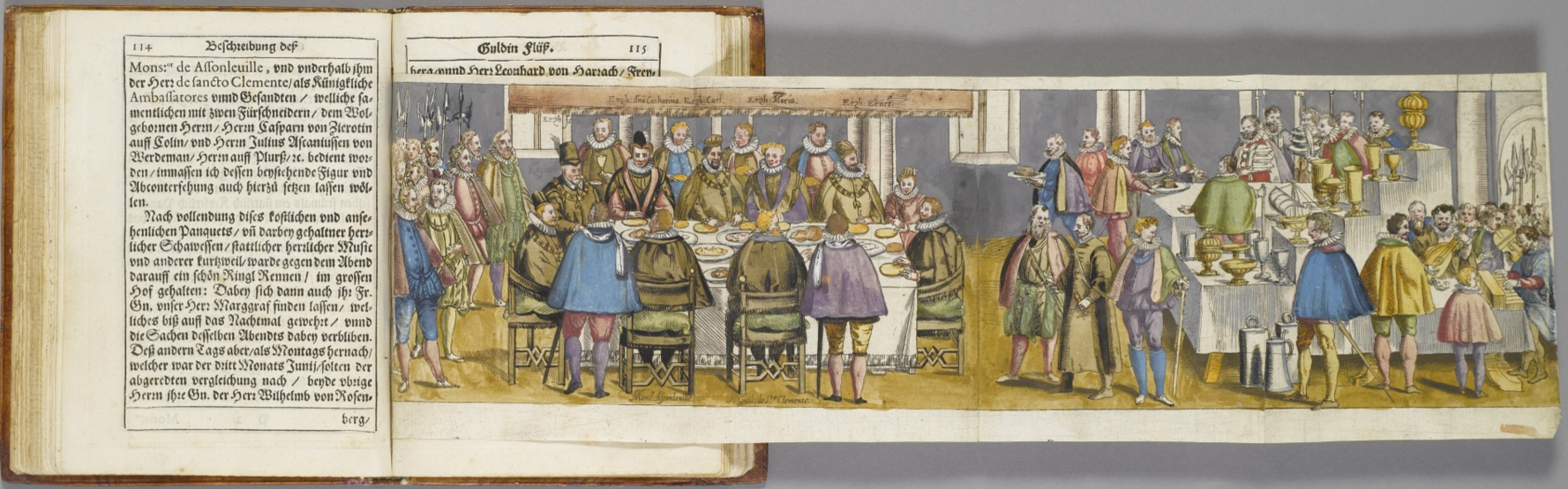
Imperial banquet from the Ordentliche Beschreibung

For the purpose of the grant of the Order, the whole court went on a journey from Innsbruck over Prague and Landshut and then to Munich and back. The book does not only describe each stop on the trip, but also all the members of the great entourage, including the author Zehendter von Zehendtgrueb and the artist Anton Boys. Anton Boys had been commissioned to illustrate the volume with folding plates of the events. These folding plates show cavalry battles, ritual ceremonies, celebrations of mass, processions, banquets, table decorations, gun practice and fireworks. In some copies these plates are coloured. Boys also made the single-page plates, which depict the insignia of the order, a knight of the Order of the Golden Fleece in full regalia and a series of armorial crests. Of the known copies of this book, some contain 17 plates. A copy in the Ornamentstichsammlung Berlin is incomplete and has only 12 plates. Only a few copies of the book are known to exist.

=== The Banquet of the Hohenems family ===
In 1578 count Jakob Hannibal I von Hohenems commissioned Anton Boys to paint the so-called Banquet of the Hohenems family (known in German as the Hohenemser Festtafel). The occasion of the banquet was the wedding of Duchess Margaretha von Hohenems with Fortunat Freiherr zu Madruz (Fortunato Madruzzo). Even though the painting purports to represent an historical dinner party, it includes members of several generations of the family, some of whom had already died at the time of the wedding. Its meaning and purpose therefore extend beyond the recording of an actual event. Rather, the arrangement of the figures around the table and the iconography of gestures reveal a political and dynastic message and showcase the success of the Hohenems family, which included many prominent personalities.

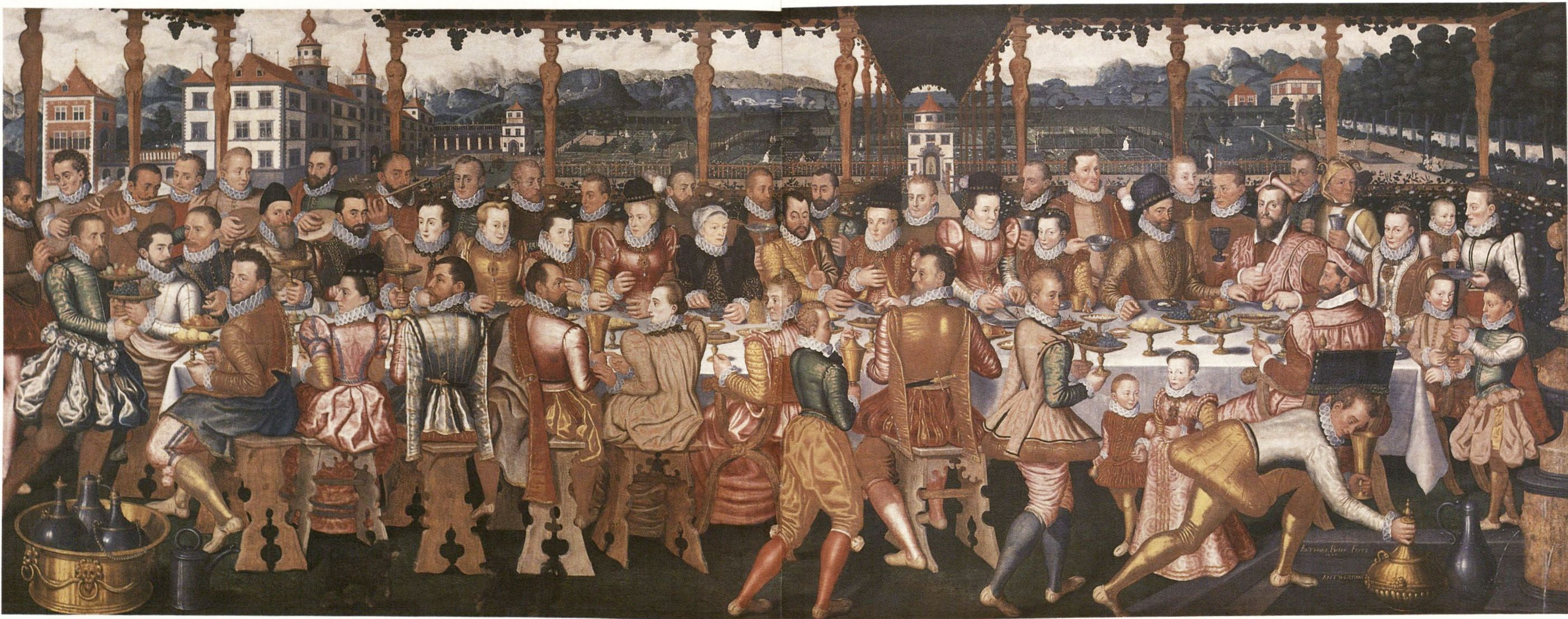
Banquet of the Hohenems family

Count Jakob Hannibal I was a scion of a very powerful family and his mother Clara (or Chiara) de' Medici was a sister of Pope Pius IV. The count himself was an important military leader, who was in the service of the Habsburgs and was also the head of the Vatican army.

The Banquet of the Hohenems family shows all the important members of the host's family and some of his friends sitting at a festive table, which is placed in the park of a Renaissance palace. A total of 24 persons are sitting at the banquet table, not all of whom have been identified. In the background an idealized mountain landscape is visible. The painting is of a large size at 210 cm in height and 542 cm in width. This size allowed the artist to depict the persons in the scene at half their real-life size. The persons who sit at the first row of the table all have their heads turned sideways so that they can be recognized from their profile.

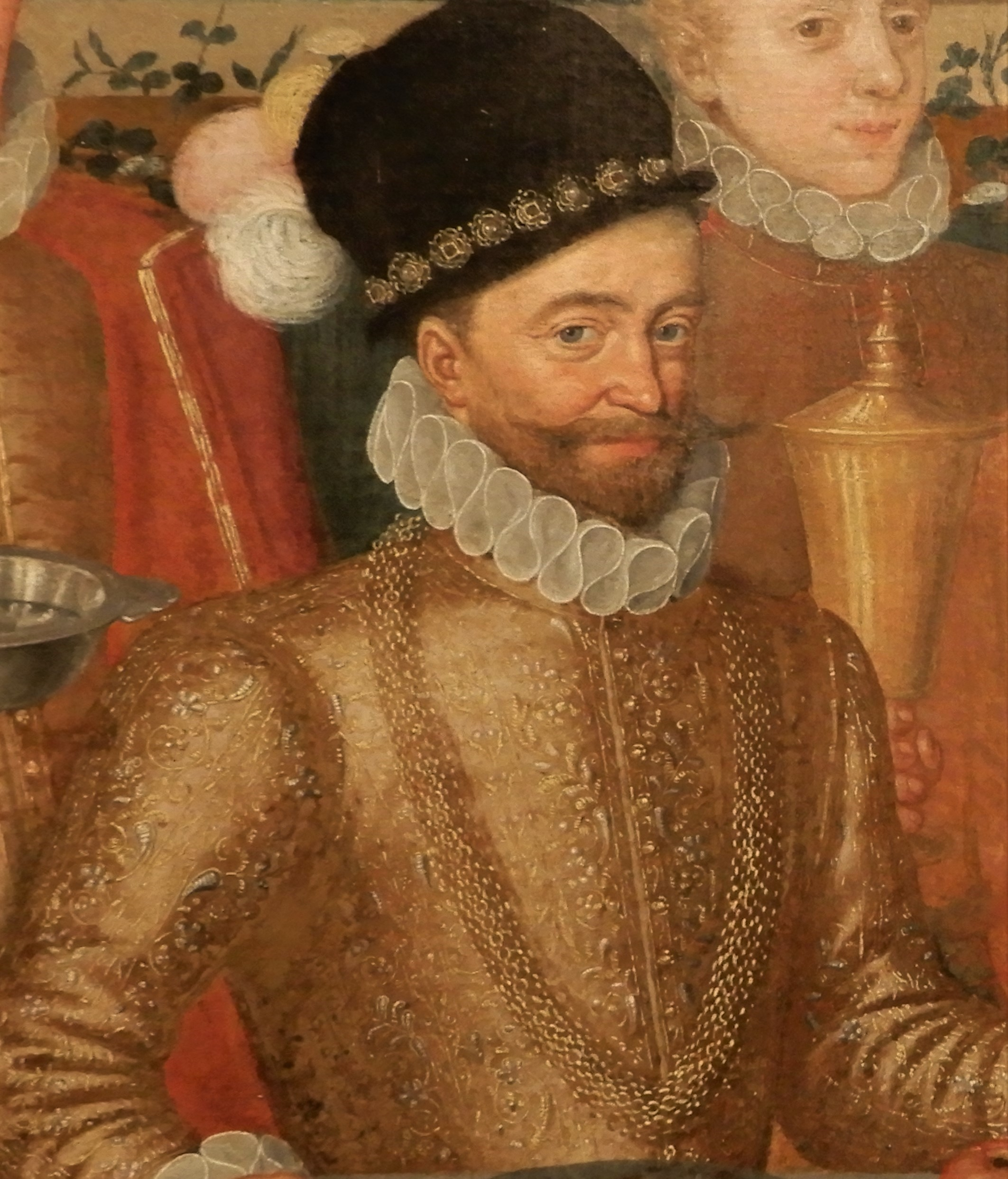
Count Jakob Hannibal I , detail of the Banquet

The count, wearing a black hat, sits on the right side of the table facing the viewer. On his left is his brother Mark Sittich, a powerful Cardinal in Rome and the Bishop of Constance. Hortensia Borromea, the wife of count Jakob Hannibal, is depicted on the left side of Mark Sittich. Opposite them is the count's cousin Cardinal Carlo Borromeo, a leading figure in the Counter-Reformation who was later beatified by the Catholic church. Carlo Borromeo was also the half-brother of the count's wife. The count has just offered his brother Mark Sittich a small round fruit, which his brother has accepted and is holding pinned on the table with his left index finger. The gesture shows the close relationship between the brothers. Another intimate scene is played out at the center of the table where the wedding couple is sitting: the bridegroom Fortunat Freiherr zu Madruz has pierced with his knife tip a pear that his bride Margaretha von Hohenems (the sister of the host) retains with her hand on her plate.

The Count's mother Clara de Medici is shown in the center of the picture wearing a black mourning dress, apparently mourning her own death since she had already died at the time when the wedding banquet took place. In addition to the guests the painting also depicts the servants, musicians and even the court jester who is shown at the right end of the table wearing a yellow cap and holding a goblet. The painting shows the end of the meal as the table is full of raised bowls filled with fruit, candied fruit and confectionery, which were only eaten as desert by wealthy families. In the foreground, the sommelier is busy filling the drinking goblets in gilt silver, protected by a lid. The cup bearers subsequently carry the goblets to the guests who have asked for them.

The painting forms an important document on the count's family, which played such an influential role in Central Europe at that time. It also provides some insights into various aspects of that time's culture. For instance, only one person is seen using a fork at the table, an indication that the use of forks was not widespread at the time.
