= Hellbrunn =

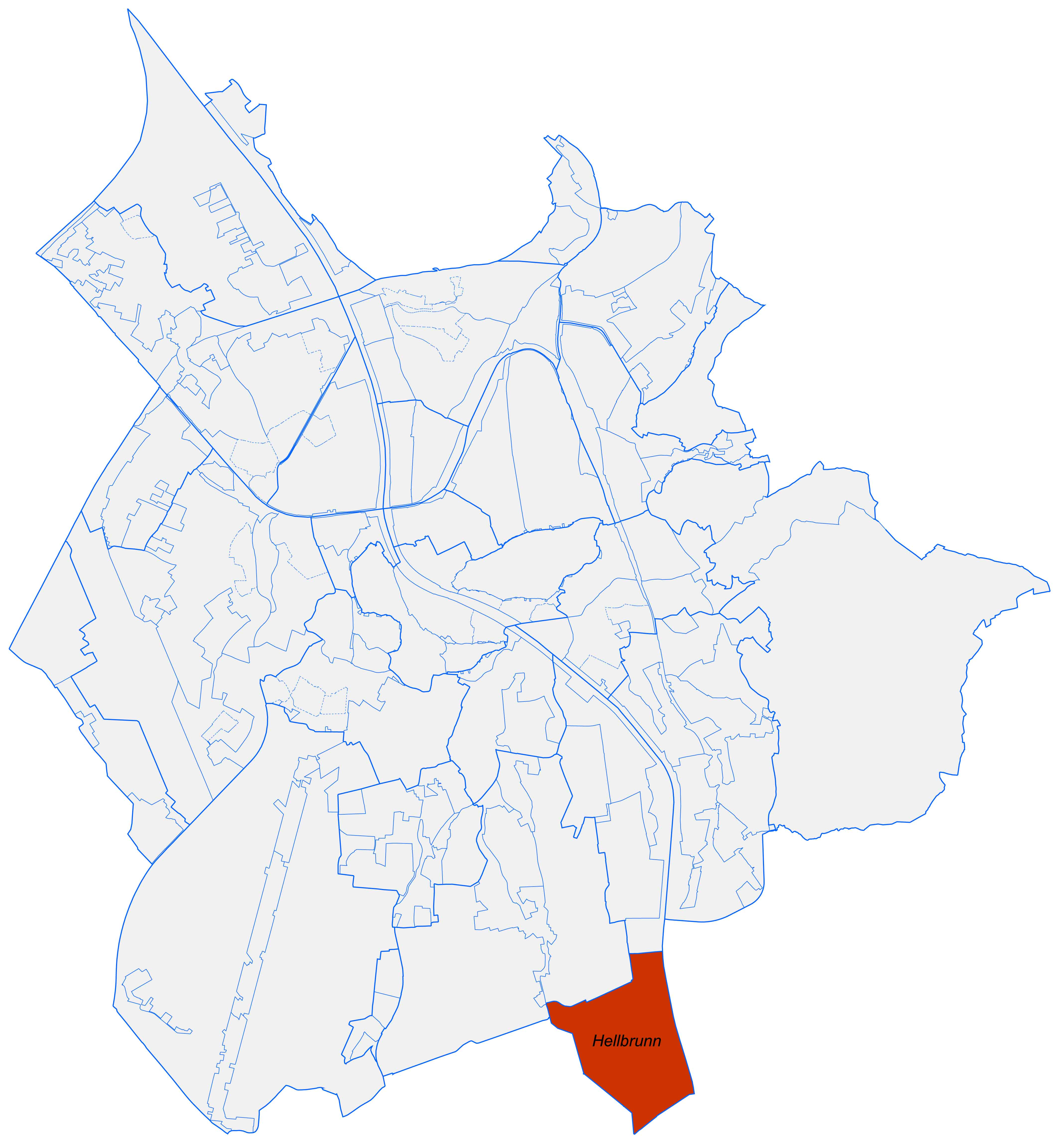
Hellbrunn in Salzburg

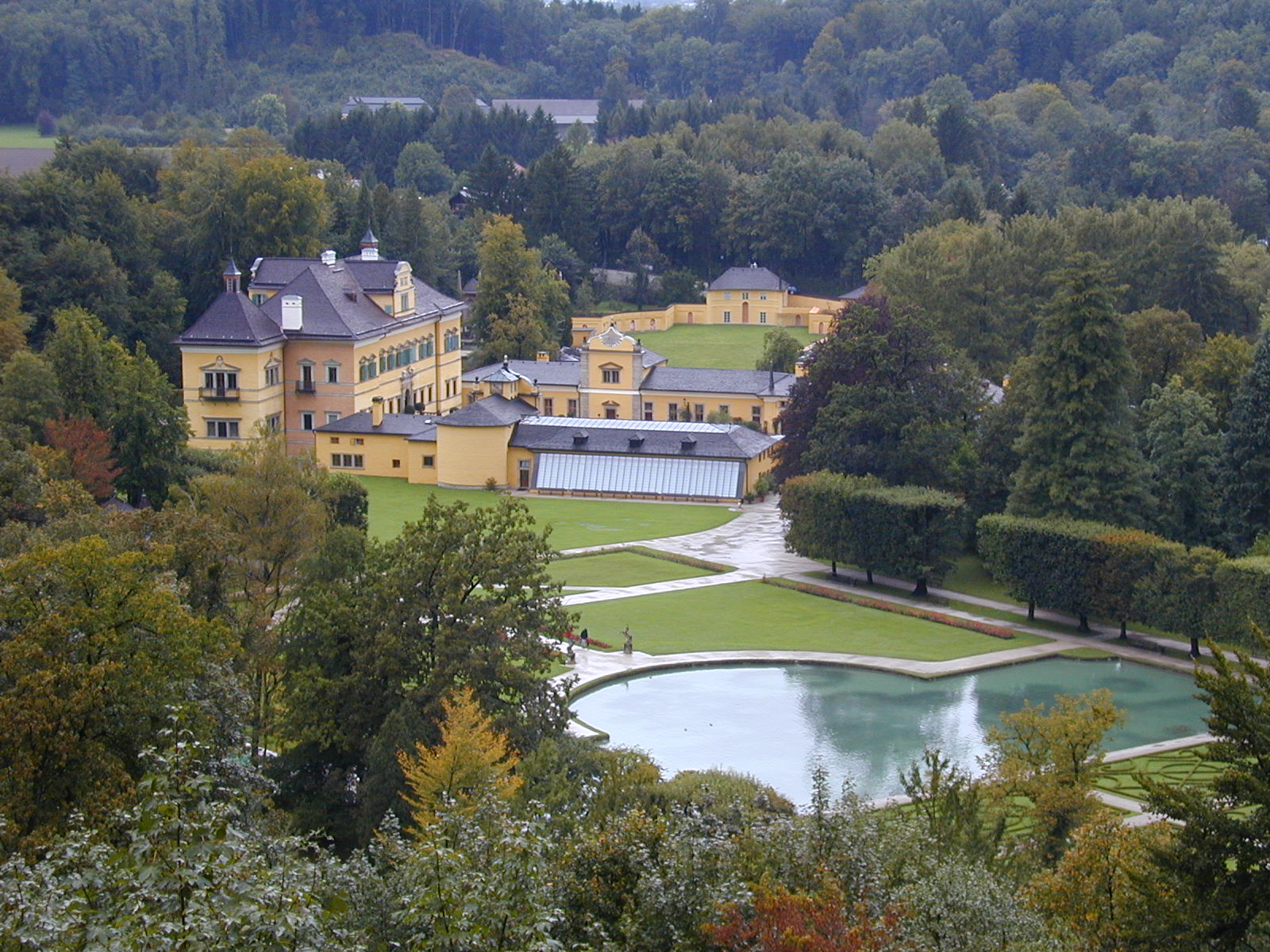
Hellbrunn Castle

Hellbrunn is a Landschaftsraum (landscape region) located in Salzburg, Salzburgerland, Austria.

== Geography ==
Hellbrunn is located in the south of the city. It borders Fürstenweg on the north, Anif on the south and west, and the Salzach river on the east.

== Places of interest ==
The two main tourist attractions in Hellbrunn are the Hellbrunn Palace, known for its trick fountains, and the Salzburg Zoo, home to over 1500 animals.

== Zones ==
Hellbrunn is divided in two zones: Schlosspark Hellbrunn and Hellbrunner.

== See also ==
- Salzburg
- Salzburgerland
