= Neu-Ems Castle =

Castle in Austria

- Vorarlberg, Austria
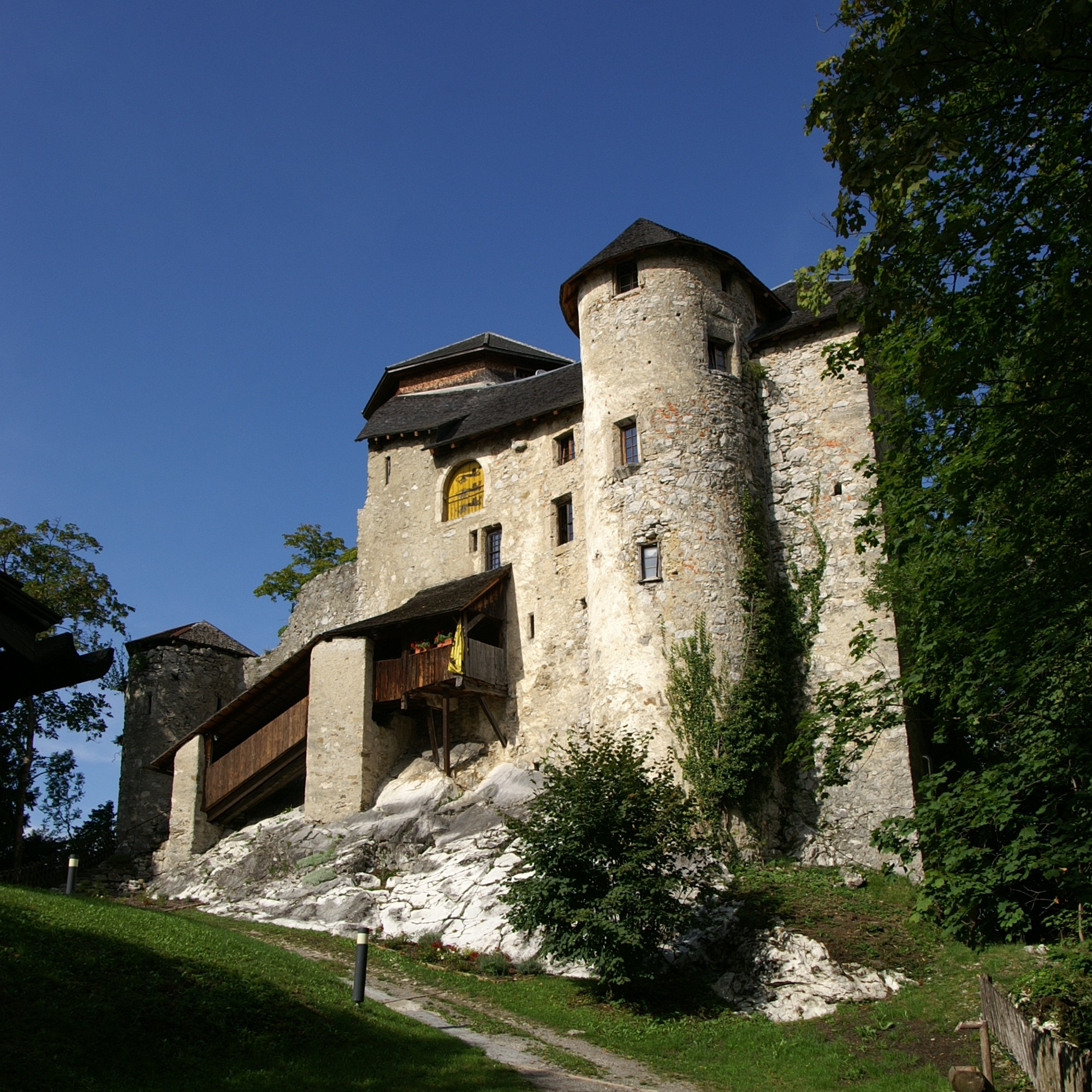
- Southern view of Neu-Ems

Site information
- Type: Castle
- Owner: Waldburg-Zeil
- Open to the public: no
- Condition: conserved

Location
- Coordinates: 47°22′06″N 09°42′20″E

Site history
- Built: 1343
- Built by: Ulrich I of Ems

Neu-Ems Castle (German: Burg Neu-Ems or Schloss Glopper) is a medieval hill castle located near Hohenems in the province of Vorarlberg, Austria. Built during politically turbulent times in the region, it is the more recent of two fortifications built by the noble Hohenems family in the area. Neu-Ems Castle is 666 metres (2,185 ft) above sea level.

== Location ==
The castle lies in the mountainside village of Emsreute, along the ridge of the Rhine valley.

== History ==
Approved by Emperor Louis IV the Bavarian, the castle was established by Knight Ulrich I of Ems, intend. He placed it near his fortress Alt-Ems on a hilltop.

During the Appenzell Wars in 1407, the castle was destroyed and rebuilt shortly afterwards.

In 1603 a chapel was built adjoining the ground floor. Today, all the remains of the chapel are two lancelet windows from the north wall. The former winged altar of this chapel has been on exhibition in the Tyrolean State Museum in Innsbruck since 1835.

Since 1843 the stronghold has been privately owned by the family Waldburg-Zeil.

== See also ==
- List of castles in Austria
