= Markus Sittich von Hohenems =

Austrian nobleman

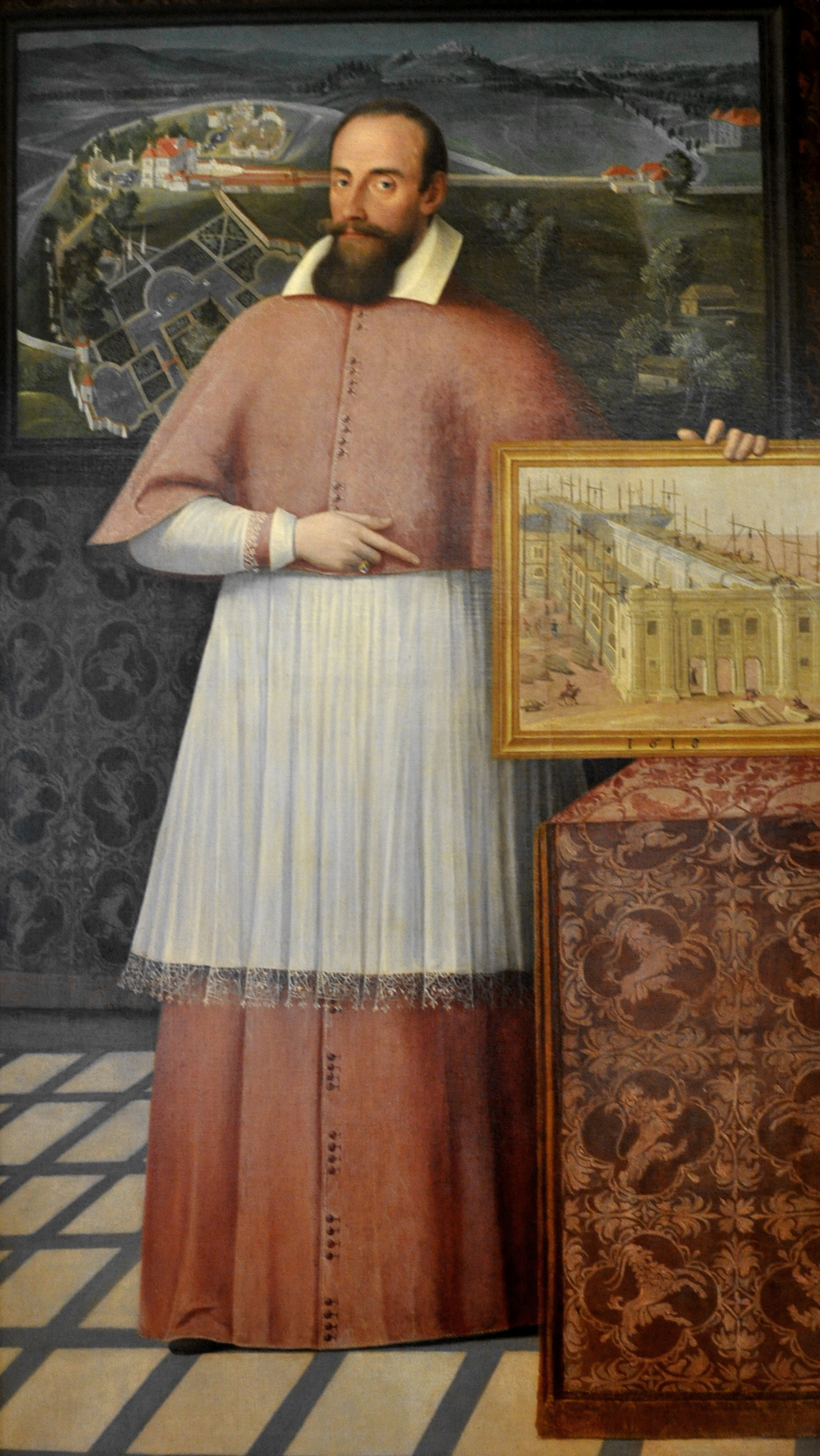
Archbishop Mark Sittich, portrait by Donato Mascagni, 1618

Mark Sittich von Hohenems (24 June 1574 – 9 October 1619) was Prince-Archbishop of Salzburg from 1612 until his death.

== Biography ==
Mark Sittich von Hohenems was born in Hohenems, Further Austria (Vorarlberg), a member of the noble House of Ems. His father, Jakob Hannibal of Hohenems (1530–1587), was an army general in the service of the Habsburg emperor Charles V and his uncle, the Constance bishop Mark Sittich von Hohenems Altemps (1533–1595), was raised to Cardinal by Pope Pius IV in 1561. A minor upon his father's death in 1587, he was educated by his powerful uncle and became a canon in Constance. Two years later, he joined the Salzburg Cathedral chapter under his cousin Prince-Archbishop Wolf Dietrich Raitenau, while studying in Milan and, since 1585, in Rome.

Following the defeat and arrest of Archbishop Wolf Dietrich Raitenau by Bavarian forces in 1612, the cathedral chapter elected him to be the new Prince-Archbishop of Salzburg on 18 March 1612. He received Holy Orders from the hands of the Chiemsee bishop Ehrenfried von Kuenburg on October 7. Raitenau gave his consent, hoping to be released from his custody at Hohensalzburg Castle; his hopes, however, were disappointed.

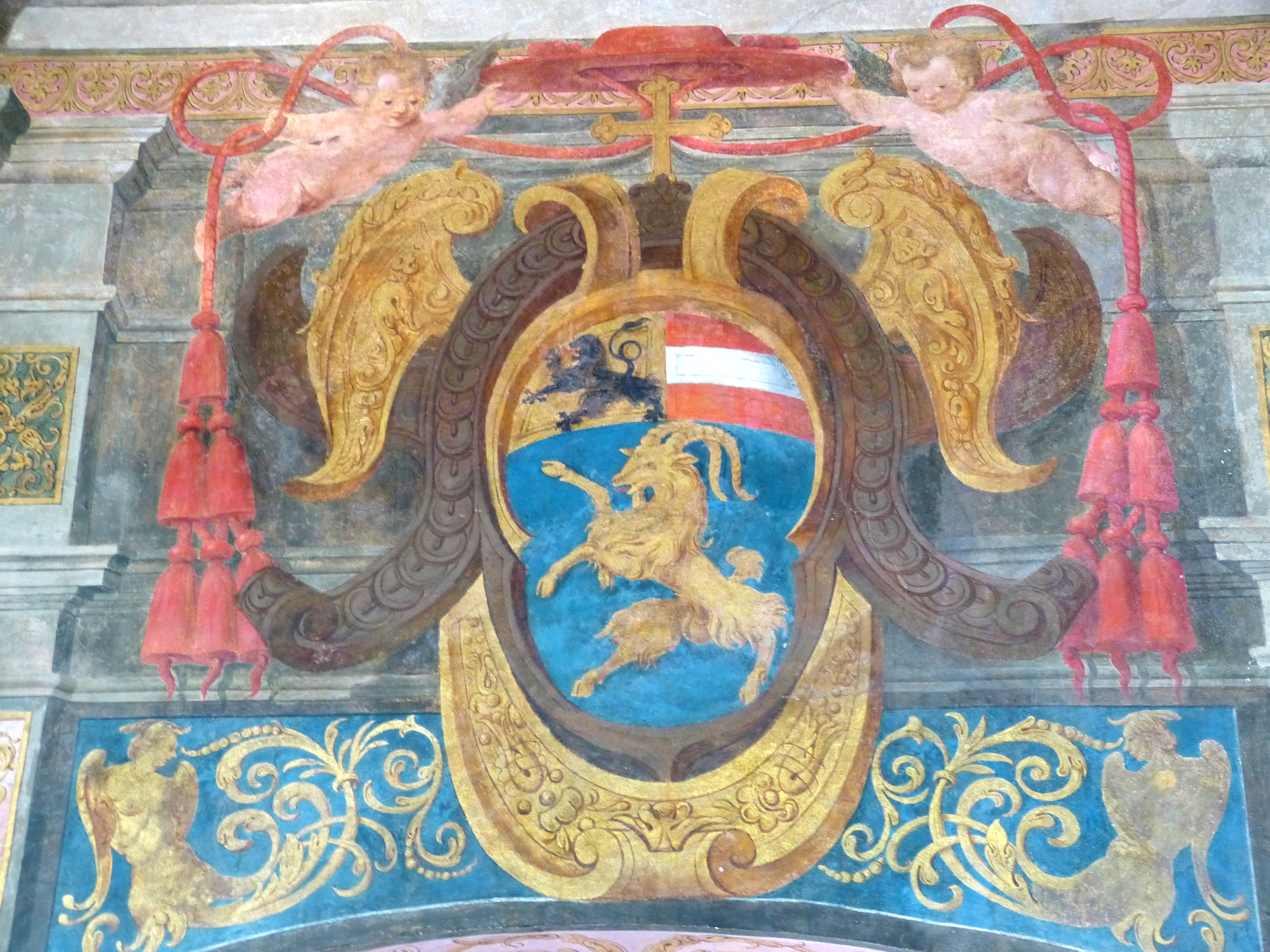
Coat of arms of Archbishop Mark Sittich, Hellbrunn Palace

As Prince-archbishop, Mark Sittich had no intention to be a puppet of Duke Maximilian of Bavaria: by refusing to enter the Catholic League, he was able to keep the Archbishopric of Salzburg out of the Thirty Years' War. His relatives, the Counts of Hohenems, tolerated Lutheranism and sponsored the arts, but paying taxes to both warring entities failed to keep them out of the warfare, only prompting taxpayer unrest.

During his incumbency, the Archbishop took up the Counter-Reformation policies of his predecessor and had stern measures imposed on his subjects. According to the resolutions of the Council of Trent, he founded fraternities in order to promote orthodoxy. Sittich also continued the redevelopment of his Salzburg residence: he employed the Italian architect Santino Solari to pursue the reconstruction of Salzburg Cathedral according to plans designed by Vincenzo Scamozzi, with the foundation stone of the new building being laid in 1614. Nevertheless, the church building was not finished until in 1628 under Paris von Londron. The archbishop also commissioned Santino Solari to build Hellbrunn Palace as his summer residence in the style of an ancient villa rustica, including extended gardens and its famous fountains. He was thus a major figure in promoting Baroque architecture north of the Alps. Moreover, under his rule, Monteverdi's opera L'Orfeo was performed on several occasions in Salzburg between 1614 and 1619, the first opera performances north of the Alps.

During the last stage of his rule, Mark Sittich witnessed the outbreak of the Thirty Years' War in 1618. On 16 July 1619, he received the Habsburg archduke Ferdinand II en route to the Imperial election in Frankfurt. Joined by the English envoy James Hay, they shared a festive meal and Ferdinand left Salzburg the next day with an archiepiscopal letter of credit for 50,000 guilders.

Later in September, while Markus Sittikus awaited the arrival of the newly crowned Holy Roman Emperor on his way back to Vienna, he fell seriously ill with fever and died within fourteen days on 9 October 1619. He was buried in the Franciscan church in Salzburg.
