= Hellbrunn Palace =

Baroque villa near Morzg, Salzburg, Austria

Coordinates: 47°45′44″N 13°03′39″E

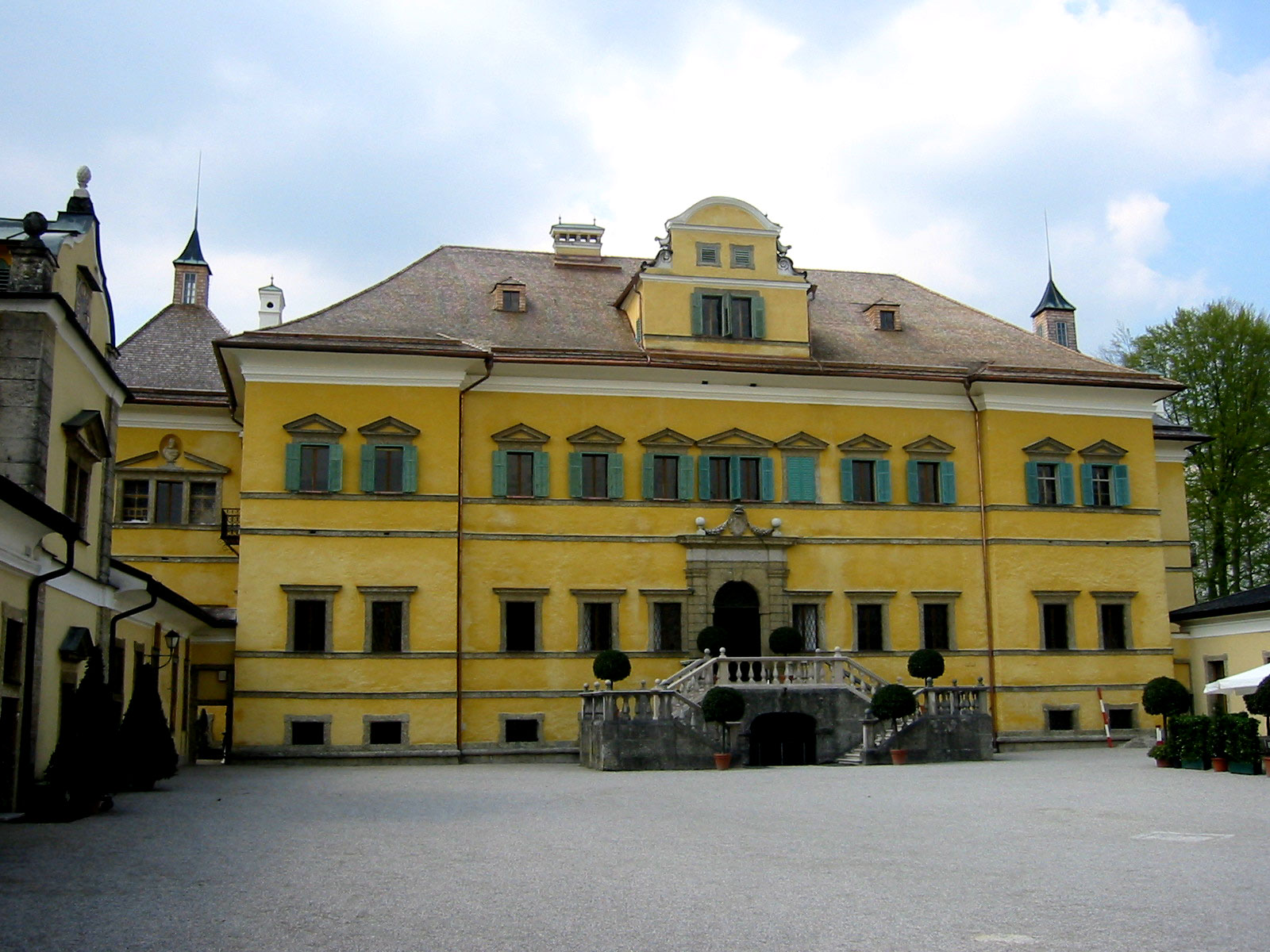
Schloss Hellbrunn

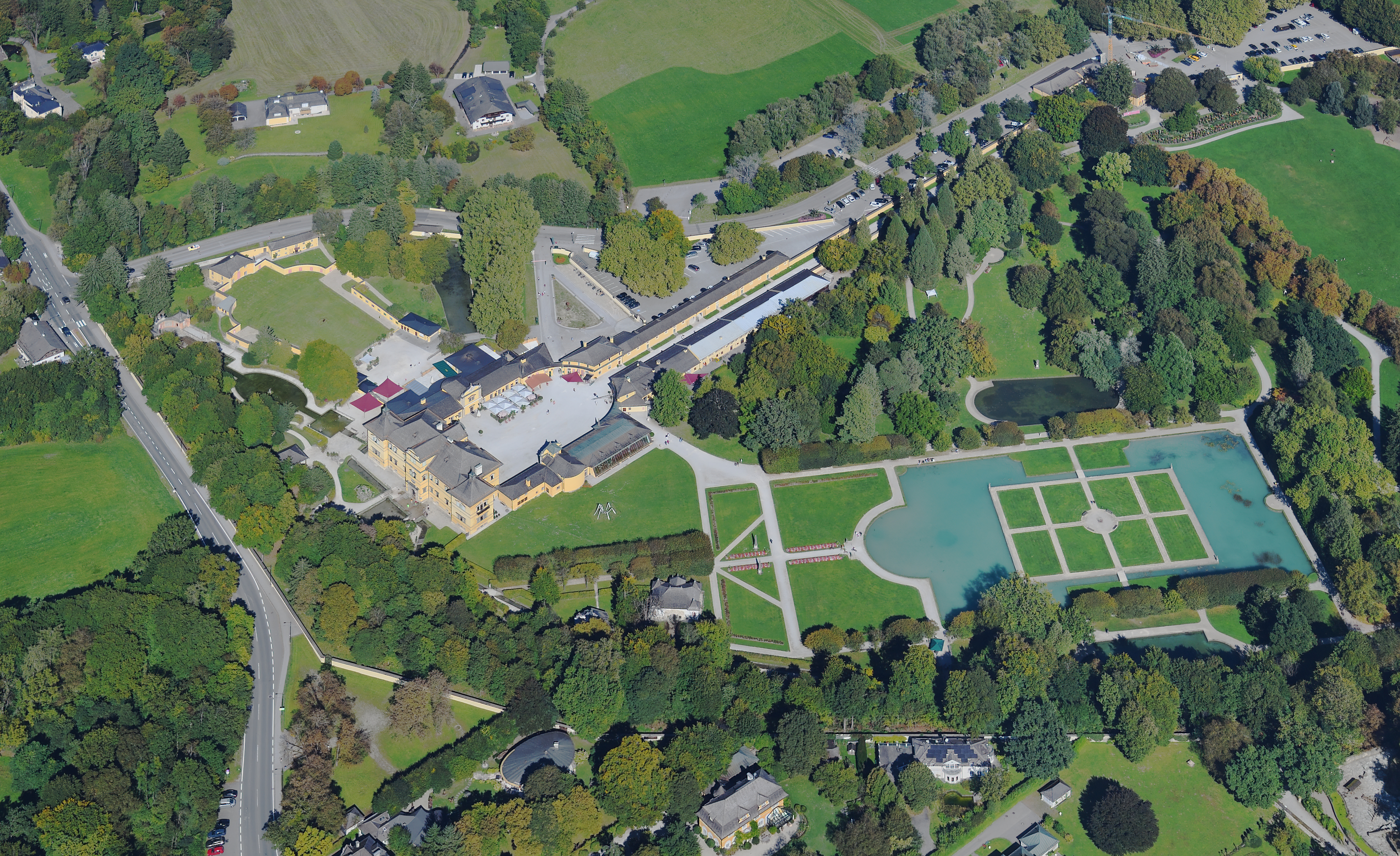
Aerial view of Hellbrunn Palace and its gardens

Hellbrunn Palace (German: Schloss Hellbrunn) is an early Baroque villa of palatial size, located in Hellbrunn, the southern countryside district (Landschaftsraum) of the city of Salzburg, Austria. It was built in 1613–19 by Markus Sittikus von Hohenems, Prince-Archbishop of Salzburg, and named for the "clear spring" that supplied it. Hellbrunn was only meant for use as a day residence in summer, as the Archbishop usually returned to Salzburg in the evening; therefore, there is no bedroom in Hellbrunn.

== Overview ==
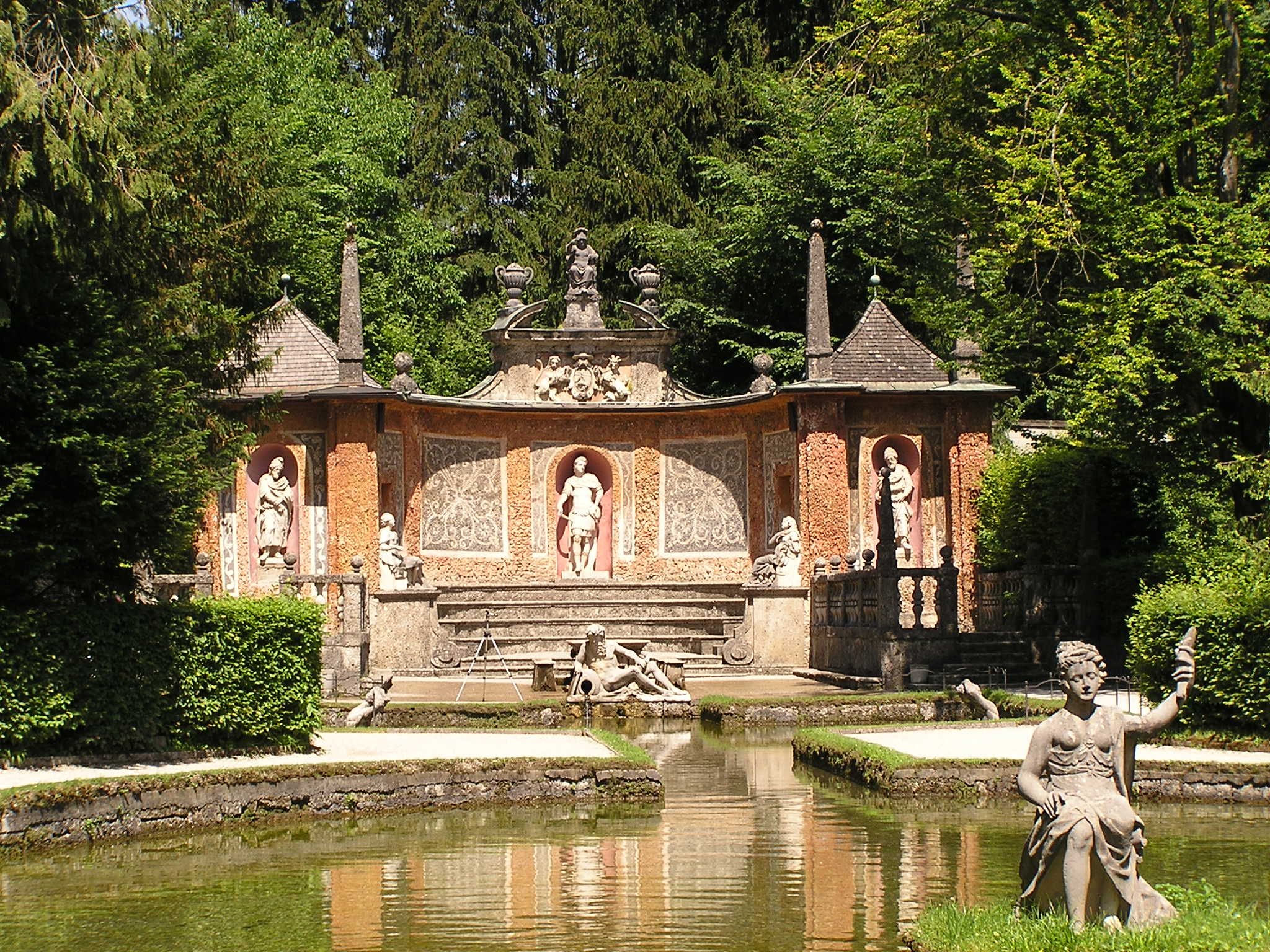
Part of the waterpark at Schloss Hellbrunn

The schloss is also famous for its jeux d'eau (watergames) in the grounds, which are a popular tourist attraction in the summer months. These games were conceived by Markus Sittikus, a man with a keen sense of humour, as a series of practical jokes to be performed on guests. Notable features include stone seats around a stone dining table through which a water conduit sprays water into the seat of the guests when the mechanism is activated, and hidden fountains that surprise and spray guests while they partake in the tour. Other features are a mechanical, water-operated and music-playing theatre built in 1750 including some 200 automata showing various professions at work, a grotto and a crown being pushed up and down by a jet of water, symbolising the rise and fall of power. At all of these there is always a spot which is never wet: that was where the Archbishop stood or sat, to which there is no water conduit and which is today occupied by the tour guide.

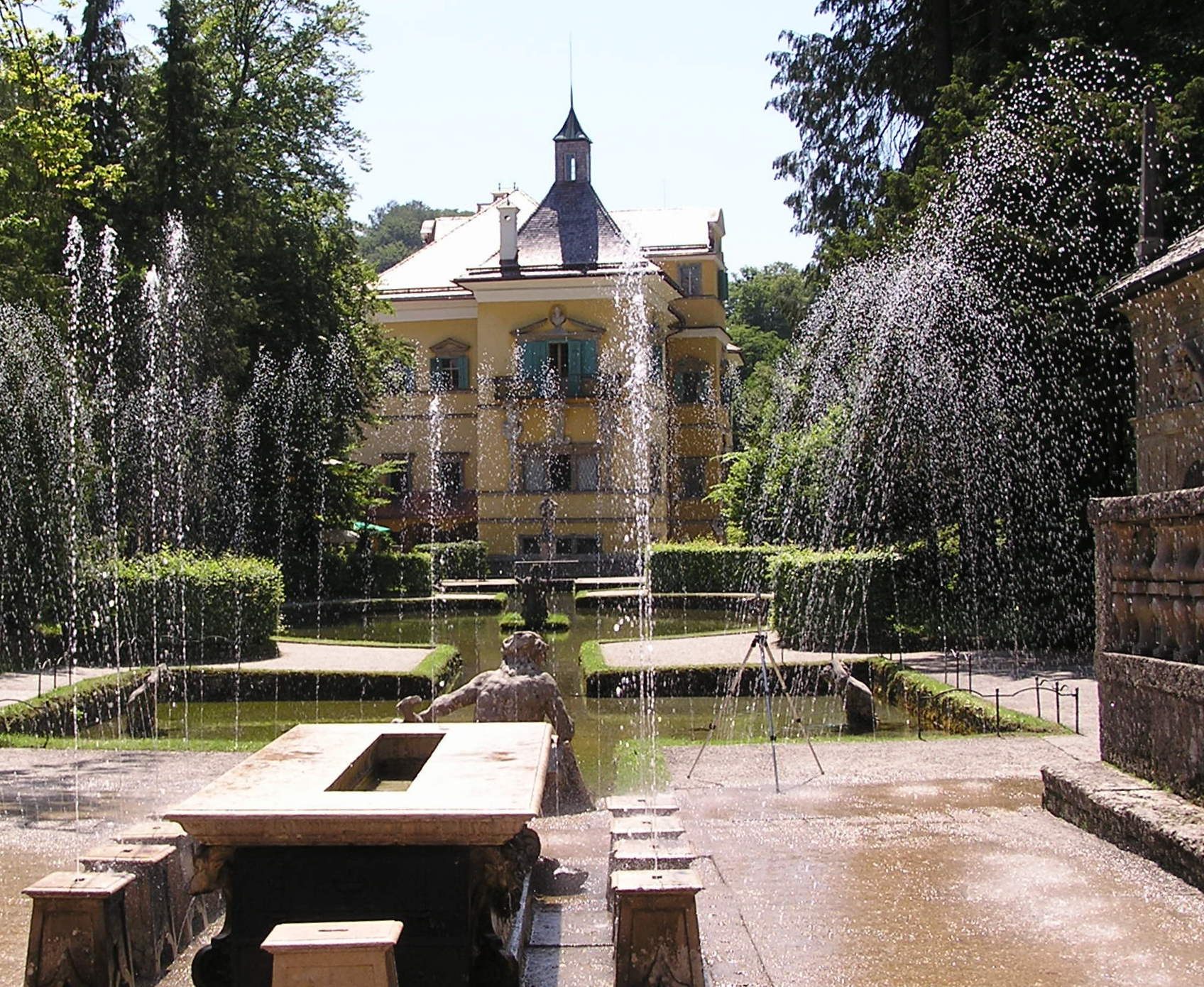
Trick fountains hidden in the seats around a dinner table. Note the seat at the head of the table (that of the Prince-Archbishop as host) does not have water coming out of it.

Hellbrunn stands in a large park with a neighboring zoo, a stone theater and a small building known as the Monatschlössl, or the "little month-palace", as it was built during the period of one month after a visitor commented to Sittikus that a building on the hill would improve the view from one of the schloss' windows. The archbishop took heed of his advice, and when the visitor returned a month later the Monatschlössl was built. It now houses the ethnographical section of the Carolina Augusteum Museum of Salzburg.

== Coin ==
The Castle of Hellbrunn Coin

The castle is so popular and famous that it was the subject of a collectors coin: the Austrian 10 euro Castle of Hellbrunn Coin, minted on April 21, 2004. The obverse depicts the main access to the castle from its forecourt. In the background there are mountains of Salzburg on the northern rim of the alpine chain.

== See also ==
- King Alfonso II of Naples and the Villa Poggio Reale – surprise jets of water in the garden.
