= Mark Sittich von Hohenems Altemps =

German Roman Catholic bishop and cardinal

His Eminence Mark Sittich von Hohenems
- Cardinal-Priest of Santa Maria in Trastevere
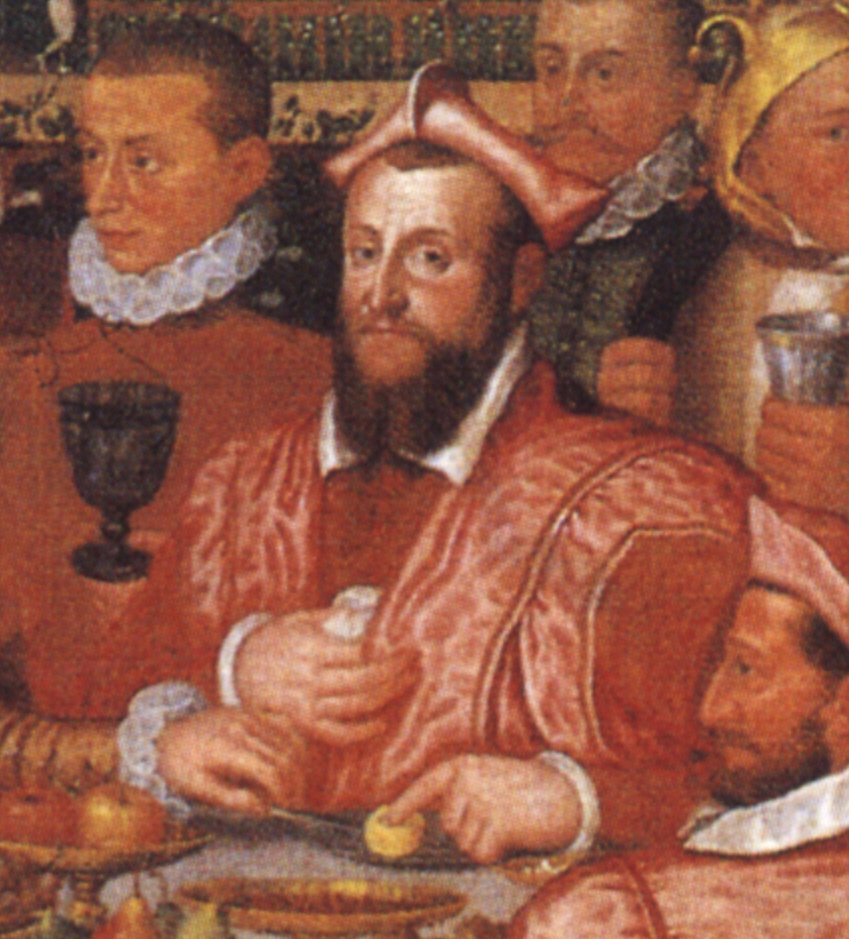
- Cardinal von Hohenems, detail from Banquet of the Hohenems family, by Anton Boys, 1578
- Church: Catholic Church
- Appointed: 5 December 1580
- Term ended: 15 February 1595
- Predecessor: Gianfrancesco Gambara
- Successor: Giulio Antonio Santorio
- Previous posts: See list: Bishop of Cassano (1560–1561); Cardinal-Deacon of Santi Apostoli (1561-1565); Cardinal-Deacon of San Giorgio in Velabro (1565-1577); Cardinal-Priest of Santa Maria degli Angeli e dei Martiri (1577-1578); Cardinal-Priest of San Pietro in Vincoli (1578-1579); Cardinal-Priest of San Clemente (1579-1580)

Orders
- Consecration: 17 February 1566 by Charles Borromeo
- Created cardinal: 26 February 1561 by Pope Pius IV
- Rank: Cardinal-Priest

Personal details
- Born: Mark Sittich von Hohenems Altemps; 1533 Hohenems, Austria
- Died: 15 February 1595 (aged 61–62) Rome, Papal States
- Buried: Santa Maria in Trastevere
- Coat of arms

Mark Sittich von Hohenems Altemps (1533–1595) was a German Roman Catholic bishop and cardinal. The addition of Altemps to the family name reflects Alt-Ems (or Alt-Embs) itself deriving from "Alta Embs" (Latin for "altus" = high), like the modern name Hohenems (High Ems in German).

== Early years, 1533-60 ==
Mark Sittich von Hohenems was born in Hohenems in 1533, the son of Wolf Ludwig von Hohenems and Chiara de' Medici (daughter of Bernardino de'Medici and Cecilia Serbelloni), a distant relative (or none at all) of the Florentine House of Medici. His mother was the sister of Giovanni Angelo Medici (Pope Pius IV). Her sister, Margherita, married Gilberto Borromeo, Conte d' Arona. He was the cousin of Cardinals Giovanni Antonio Serbelloni and Charles Borromeo. He was the uncle of Wolf Dietrich Raitenau (Wolfgang Theoderic) and Mark Sittich von Hohenems, who were both Prince-Archbishop of Salzburg, in 1587-1612 and 1612–1619 respectively.

Coat of arms of Cardinal Mark Sittich von Hohenems.

Nothing is known of any formal education he might have received. As a young man, he fought in the Italian War of 1551–1559 under the command of his uncle Giangiacopo de' Medici, one of the last of the Renaissance condottieri. He also fought against the Ottoman Empire. In 1552 he participated in Charles V's efforts to win Metz back from France, and in 1554/55 he was present at the siege of Siena and repulsed an Ottoman attack on the Tuscan port of Piombino. He became a Knight of the Order of Santiago. He had a natural son, Roberto, whom he later legitimized.

== Bishop, 1560-61 ==
His uncle Giovanni Angelo Medici was elevated to the papacy on 26 December 1559, taking the name Pius IV. He proved generous in providing benefices for his Italian and German nephews. On 23 March 1560 Mark Sittich von Hohenems became a cleric in the Apostolic Camera. He was appointed Bishop of Cassano by his papal uncle on 29 May 1560, and was named Administrator of the diocese until he reached the canonical age for consecration as a bishop. He was consecrated by his cousin Charles Borromeo on 17 February 1566. He resigned the government of the Diocese of Cassano on 11 May 1561, at the request of his uncle, who had named him a Cardinal and who had a more important See for him. In order to ensure that the Council of Trent resumed as the Pope wished, by Easter of 1562, he served as papal legate to Maximilian II, Holy Roman Emperor and Ferdinand, King of the Romans to persuade them to lend their assistance both for the reopening of the Council and for the attendance of as many bishops as possible.

== Cardinal, 1561-95 ==
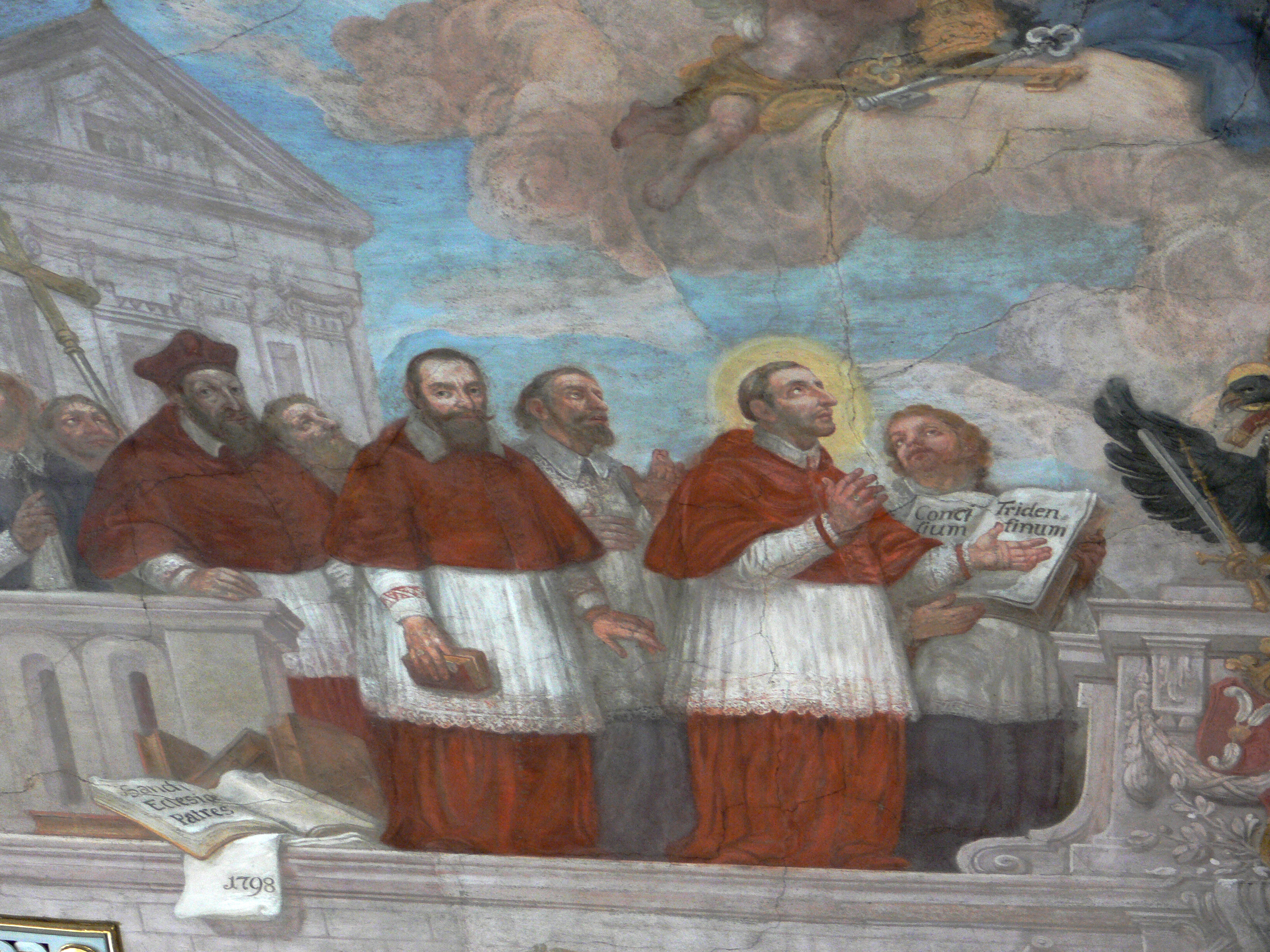
Allegory of the Council of Trent in Hohenems. Cardinal Hohenems is the first on the left; his cousin Charles Borromeo is on the right.

His uncle Pope Pius IV made him a cardinal deacon in the consistory of 26 February 1561. He received the red hat and the titular church of Santi Apostoli (as a deaconry pro illa vice, that is to say, that on this one occasion, by special papal order, the Basilica of the XII Apostles, which ordinarily belonged to a cardinal priest, was to be considered a deaconry so that Cardinal Altemps, a deacon, could hold it) on 10 March 1561. It was because he had been created a cardinal in the See of Rome that he resigned the See of Cassano.

The cathedral chapter of Konstanz Minster elected him to be Bishop of Konstanz, and he was preconized as bishop by Pius IV on 24 October 1561. The pope subsequently made him perpetual legate in Avignon. He also became archpriest of the Lateran Basilica, now called the Papal Archbasilica of St. John Lateran. On 10 November 1561 he was appointed legate to the Council of Trent and, on 27 December 1561, governor of Fermo.

He opted for the order of cardinal priests on 30 July 1563, keeping Santi Apostoli as his titular church and dropping the temporary designation as a Deaconry. He was subsequently appointed governor of Norcia and Monte Leonis on 3 October 1564; as legate in Marche on 1 November 1564; and as governor of Ascoli Piceno on 3 November 1564. In 1566, he served as papal legate to the Diet of Augsburg. On 15 May 1565 he opted for the deaconry of San Giorgio in Velabro, raised pro illa vice to the status of a titular church. On 18 August 1565 he became governor of Ancona and, on 11 November 1565, governor for life of Stroncone, Umbria. He was the governor of Capranica, Lazio from 1565 to 1568. In each case, others governed on his behalf, though he collected a considerable part of the income of the offices.

He was a participant in the papal conclave of 1565-66 that elected Pope Pius V. In February 1566, he received leave to depart from Rome to Konstanz. In Konstanz he conducted a diocesan Synod in September. In 1577 he authorized the publication of the Catechism of Pius V in his diocese. He was also eager to introduce the Jesuits into the Diocese of Konstanz, and corresponded with the Jesuit General Francisco Borgia on the subject, though the project was long in bearing fruit. He returned to Rome to participate in the papal conclave of 1572 that elected Pope Gregory XIII.

In 1568, Marco Sittico bought a property in Rome that he immediately set about rebuilding as the Palazzo Altemps, to designs by Martino Longhi the Elder; he also built the Villa Mondragone at Frascati. He assembled a formidable collection of Roman antiquities and sculptures.

He opted for the titular church of Santa Maria degli Angeli e dei Martiri on 3 October 1577, for the titular church of San Pietro in Vincoli on 3 October 1578, for San Clemente on 17 August 1579 and for Santa Maria in Trastevere on 5 December 1580.

He participated in the papal conclave of 1585 that elected Pope Sixtus V. Sometime before 31 July 1589 he resigned the government of the Diocese of Konstanz. Because of illness, he resigned as legate in Avignon on 4 June 1590. He subsequently participated in the papal conclave of September 1590 that elected Pope Urban VII; the papal conclave of October–December 1590 that elected Pope Gregory XIV; the papal conclave of 1591 that elected Pope Innocent IX; and the papal conclave of 1592 that elected Pope Clement VIII. In November 1592, he became legate in Viterbo.

== Death and legacy ==
The powerful cardinal died in Rome on 15 February 1595. He was buried in Santa Maria in Trastevere.

He had guided the education and early career of his nephew, Mark Sittich von Hohenems (Prince-Archbishop of Salzburg) (1574–1619). However, Lutheranism spread through his home area, under the patronage of the Counts of Hohenems, and the area was devastated by the Thirty Years' War and plague. His illegitimate son Roberto was made Duke of Gallese, took the family name of Altemps, and married Cornelia Orsini.

== Sources ==
- Simonetta Scherling, Markus Sittikus III. (1533-1595): vom deutschen Landsknecht zum römischen Kardinal (Konstanz: UVK, Universitätsverlag Konstanz, 2000) [Forschungen zur Geschichte Voralbergs, 4].
