= Altenau Palace =

Former palace in Austria

Coordinates: 47°48′20″N 13°02′31″E

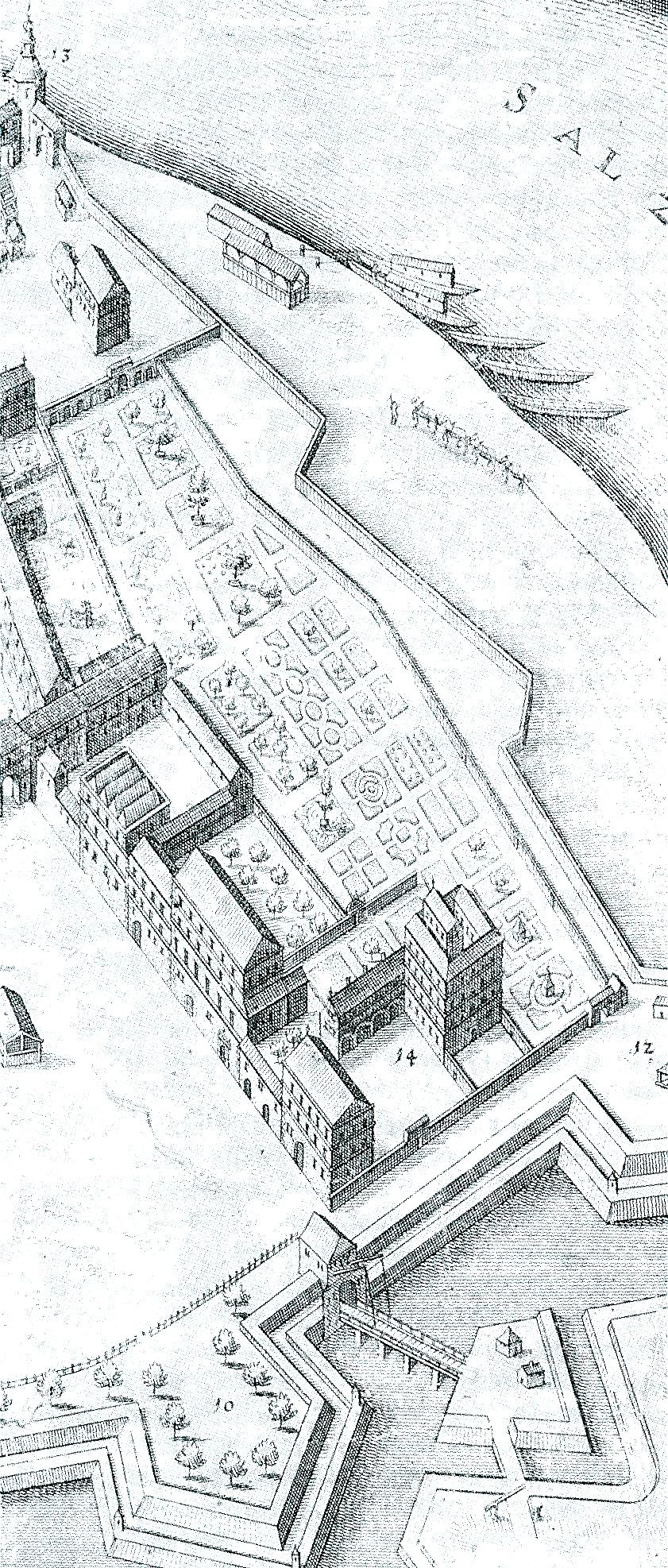
Excerpt from a map of Salzburg by Ph. Harpff (1643) showing the Altenau palace

Altenau Palace (German: Schloss Altenau) was a palace in Salzburg, Austria. Built in 1606, it was demolished in the 1720s to make way for the Mirabell Palace which stands on the same site. It was the home of prince-archbishop Wolf Dietrich von Raitenau.

== Origins and construction ==
In 1606 the prince-archbishop Wolf Dietrich von Raitenau built a palace for his mistress, Salome Alt and their children outside the Bergstraßtor gate of Salzburg. The exact reason for building the palace was an attack of gout that the archbishop had suffered during the winter of 1604/1605, and a stroke that paralysed his right arm fr four months. Following his recovery, he had this pleasure-palace built for himself and his family to escape the crowded city. The extent of how much Wolf Dietrich enjoyed living in his new home is evident from a plaque inscribed in Latin, and brought by Markus Sittikus to the Salzburg Residenz:

Chosen by God's mercy, I rule over the rushing, streaming Salzach. Because sickness robbed my suffering body of strength, I built this peaceful building as a quiet harbour in life

— translated from Latin to German by Clemens M. Hutter

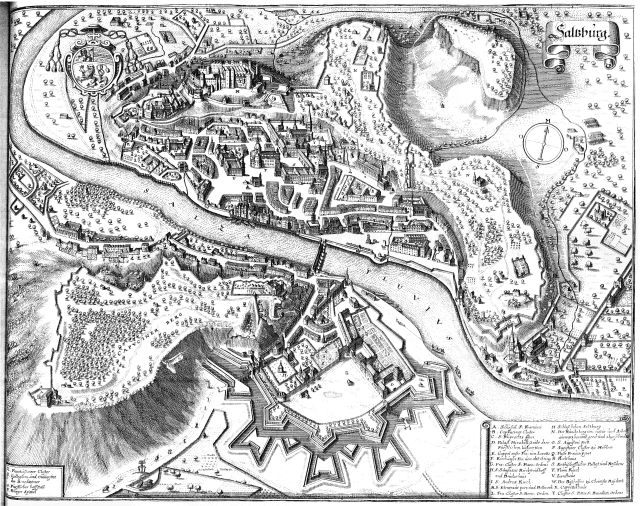
Plan of Salzburg by Matthaeus Merian (1656)

The palace was built on a small, raised alluvial fan 200 metres north of the city wall, and is said to have been completed in six months. At around 400 square meters, it was not particularly large. The name Altenau was derived from Salome Alt's family name, and the term Au, referring to a low island in the river Salzach which at the time had a very broad bed, stretching from the Mönchsberg wall of the city as far as the area of the present Schwarzstraße (embankments were not added to the river until after 1852). Because other plots in the area were too close to the floodplain of the Salzach, the Alt family already owned four herb-gardens on the raised area.

A chronicler describes the building as a large and magnificent palace or castle, surrounded by beautiful gardens of all kinds of shrubs, trees and fruit. The interior of the palace also impressed the chronicler, who states: "The very finest that one could imagine, exuberant wealth, the most beautiful women's clothes, the most beautiful jewels made of beautiful gold, precious stones and pearls - as though in a king's palace" .

The palace was a favourite residence of the prince-archbishop and his family, who 'in this beautiful building often relaxed with his own, and often spent both evenings and mornings enjoying mealtimes, and enjoying all manner of honest pleasures and entertainments' . The reference to honest pleasures is a particularly interesting indication that the archbishop's relationship to the family of his mistress was seen as legitimate.

== Subsequent history ==
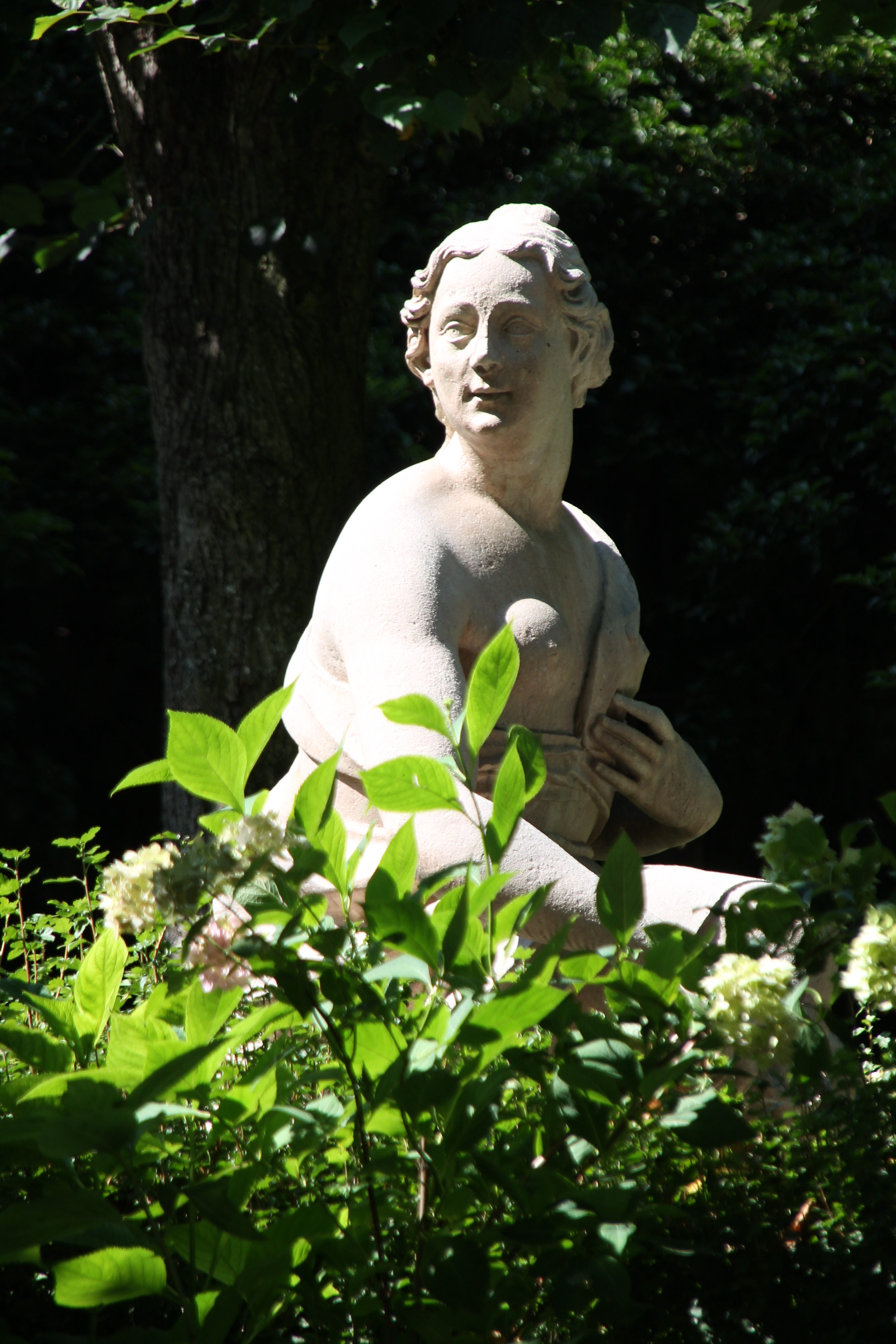
The Susanna fountain in the gardens of the modern-day Mirabell palace

After the arrest of Wolf Dietrich von Raitenau, his successor and nephew Markus Sittich von Hohenems drove Salome Alt and her children from Altenau palace. To erase the memory of his predecessor he renamed the palace Mirabell Palace. He avoided the palace but his successor, Paris Lodron, extended the palace together with its gardens into a new, strong fortification on the right bank of the Salzach, as can be clearly seen in a panorama of the city by Matthäus Merian the Elder from 1656. Lodron himself enjoyed staying at the palace and also died there. Maria Sidonia von Raitenau, née Freiin von Welsperg-Primör, spent her later years between 1639 and 1646 there with her grandchildren Maria Anna Katharina and Rudolf Hannibal; she had taken over their guardianship from their mother, Maria Jakobea, who showed "little love" for them.

After various additions (including a clock-tower added by archbishop Johann Ernst von Thun und Hohenstein), a major rebuild was carried out between 1721 and 1727 by archbishop Franz Anton von Harrach, whose architect was Johann Lukas von Hildebrandt. This converted the palace to a baroque, four-winged building with an inner courtyard.

Remains of the Altenau palace can be found in the basement of the south west corner of the present palace, next to the rose-garden. It is likely that the main walls upward of this, and many of the inner walls of this part also belong to the oldest stages of the palace's construction, because it can be shown that they were included during the work of Lukas von Hildebrandt.

The Susanna fountain, dating from 1612, stands in the park of the present-day Mirabell Palace between the hedge-theatre and the well-fountain, depicting the biblical figure of Susanna bathing. According to local lore, the statue is modelled Salome Alt herself.

== Sources ==
- Dopsch, Heinz; Hoffmann, Robert (2008). Salzburg. Die Geschichte einer Stadt (2 ed.). Salzburg: Universitätsverlag Anton Pustet. ISBN 978-3-7025-0598-1.
- Hutter, Clemens M. (2010). Mirabell. Schloss und Garten. Salzburg: Colorama Verlagsgesellschaft. ISBN 978-3-902692-19-1.
- Stahl-Botstiber, Eva (1987). "Salome Alt und das Frauenbild ihrer Zeit". In Engelsberger, Ulrike; Wagner, Franz (eds.). Fürsterzbischof Wolf Dietrich von Raitenau - Gründer des barocken Salzburg. 4. Salzburger Landesausstellung, 16. Mai-26. Oktober 1987 im Residenz-Neugebäude und im Dommuseum zu Salzburg (in German). Salzburg: Salzburger Landesregierung Kulturabteilung. p. 55-58.
- N.N. (1987). "[chapter title missing]". In Engelsberger, Ulrike; Wagner, Franz (eds.). Fürsterzbischof Wolf Dietrich von Raitenau - Gründer des barocken Salzburg. 4. Salzburger Landesausstellung, 16. Mai-26. Oktober 1987 im Residenz-Neugebäude und im Dommuseum zu Salzburg (in German). Salzburg: Salzburger Landesregierung Kulturabteilung. p. ??-??.
- Zaisberger, Friederike (1998). Geschichte Salzburgs. Munich: Oldenbourg-Verlag. ISBN 3-486-56351-3.
