= Salome Alt =

Mistress to a German prince-bishop

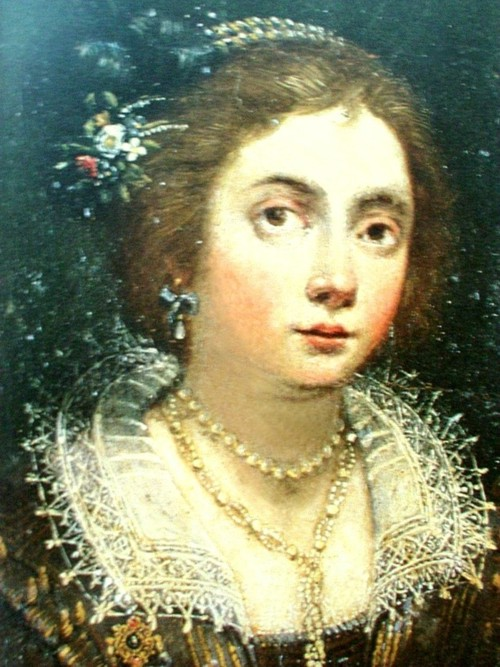
- Salome Alt
- Born: 21 November 1568. Salzburg
- Died: 27 June 1633 (aged 64)
- Known for: Mistress to Wolf Dietrich Raitenau

Salome Alt (21 November 1568 – 27 June 1633), was the mistress to Wolf Dietrich von Raitenau, reigning Prince-Archbishop of Salzburg, from about 1593 until 1617.

== Life ==
Born in Salzburg, Salome was the daughter of the merchant and city councillor Wilhelm Alt and a granddaughter of Ludwig Alt, who had been mayor of Salzburg in 1523. She was the niece of Barbara Thenn.

Contemporary sources describe her as a tall grown woman, with red-brown hair and clear grey eyes, a broad forehead, and as the most beautiful woman of the city.

=== Wolf Dietrich Raitenau's mistress ===
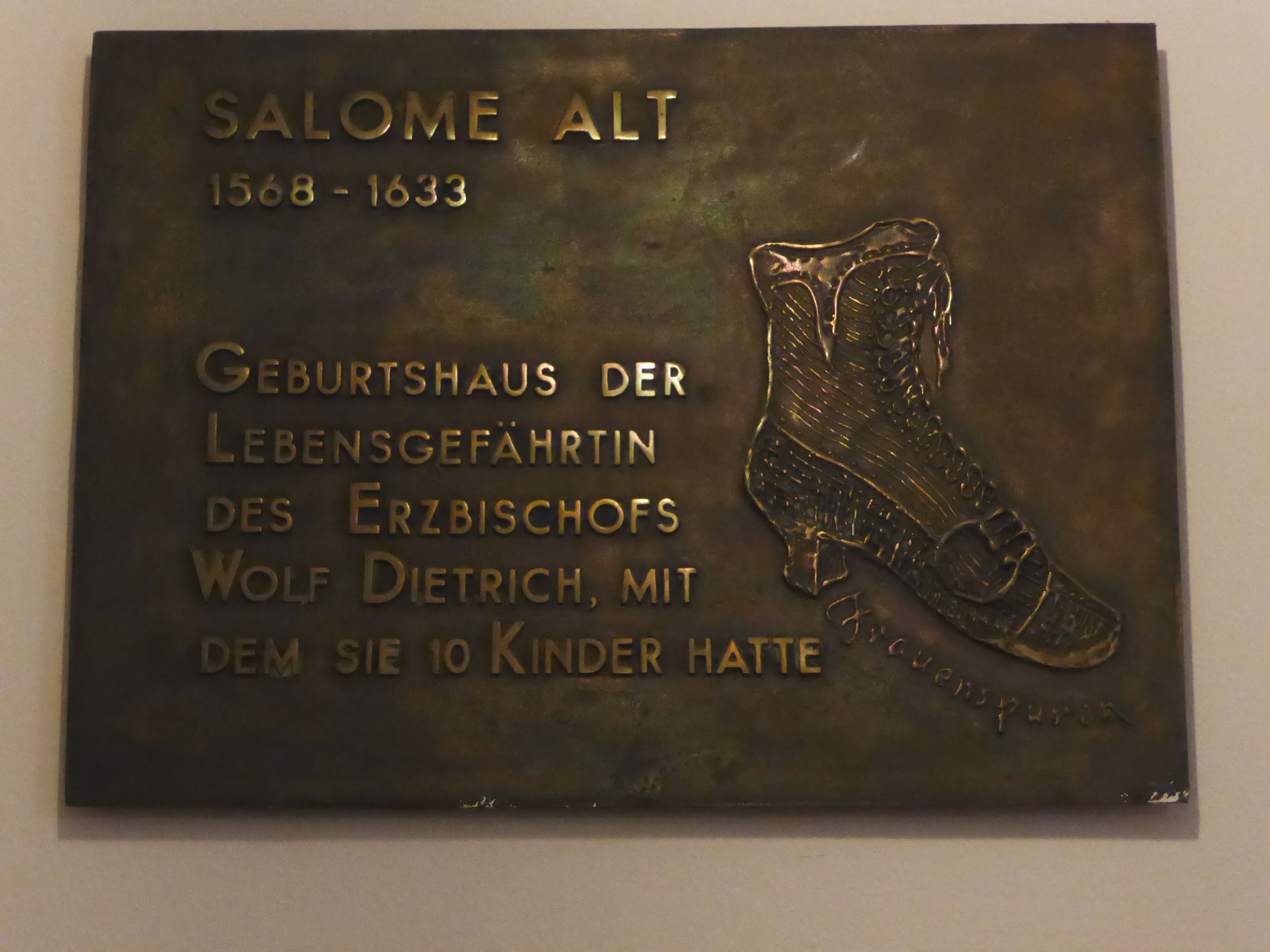
Memorial plaque on the family house of Salome Alt in Sigmund-Haffner Gasse

Salome Alt met the Archbishop at a festivity in the Alten Stadttrinkstube, whereafter Raitenau took her, initially in secret, to his Salzburg residence. It is said that she never again set foot in the town-house of her parents, in Sigmund-Haffner-Alley.

After Raitenau was chosen as prince-archbishop he repeatedly petitioned Rome for a papal dispensation to marry her. The family even claimed that Raitenau and Alt had become partners before he was ordained. It was also assumed at this time that celibacy of the clergy would soon be abolished. Despite support from his uncle, Cardinal Mark Sittich von Hohenems Altemps, no dispensation was ever granted.

At last, upon a visit by Emperor Rudolf II in 1609, their children were officially relieved from their status as illegitimate. Raitenau made no secret of the relationship; Salome Alt was present at the court, present when guests dined, and she ate at the high table.

=== Children ===
Salome Alt's partnership with Raitenau produced 15 children, of whom five died early, and from whom eleven are known by name:

1. Hannibal (born 1593, died 1616)
2. Helena
3. Euphemia (died 1638) married Max Richtersperger, a finance official at Wels, widowed
4. Maria Salome (born 1595, died 1605), she is buried at Stift Nonnberg with a monument carrying her image
5. Eusebia (died 1624),
6. Cäcilie, who on 3 June 1620 married Georg Constantin Grundemann von Falkenberg (died 1662). Children from this marriage were:
  1. Georg Constantin
  2. Adam Anton who married Susanna Katharina Grüber von Grübegg
  3. Franz Fortunat (Benedictine monk at Kremsmünster)
  4. Johann Erasmus (died in the military service of the Kaiser)
  5. Ferdinand Wilhelm (who died in a branch of the Donau at Linz, aged 13 years)
  6. Ferdinand Adam Rudolf (died in childhood).
    The descendents of Salome Alt von Altenau can be traced to the 21st Century via Cäcilie's children.
7. Anton
8. Wolf Dietrich
9. Viktor (born 1604, died 1638 in Freihaus zu Wels. On 20 February 1634, in the cathedral of Salzburg, he married Katharina Götz, daughter of the chancellor of the Bavarian electorate at Burghausen, Johann Götz
10. Johann Georg Eberhard (born 1605, died 1675) Took the name Ägidius and became a Benedictine monk at Stift Kremsmünster
11. Susanna.

After Raitenau's fall from favour, Salome Alt expressed a wish that none of her children should marry, "so long as her gracious lord should remain incarcerated".

=== In high society ===
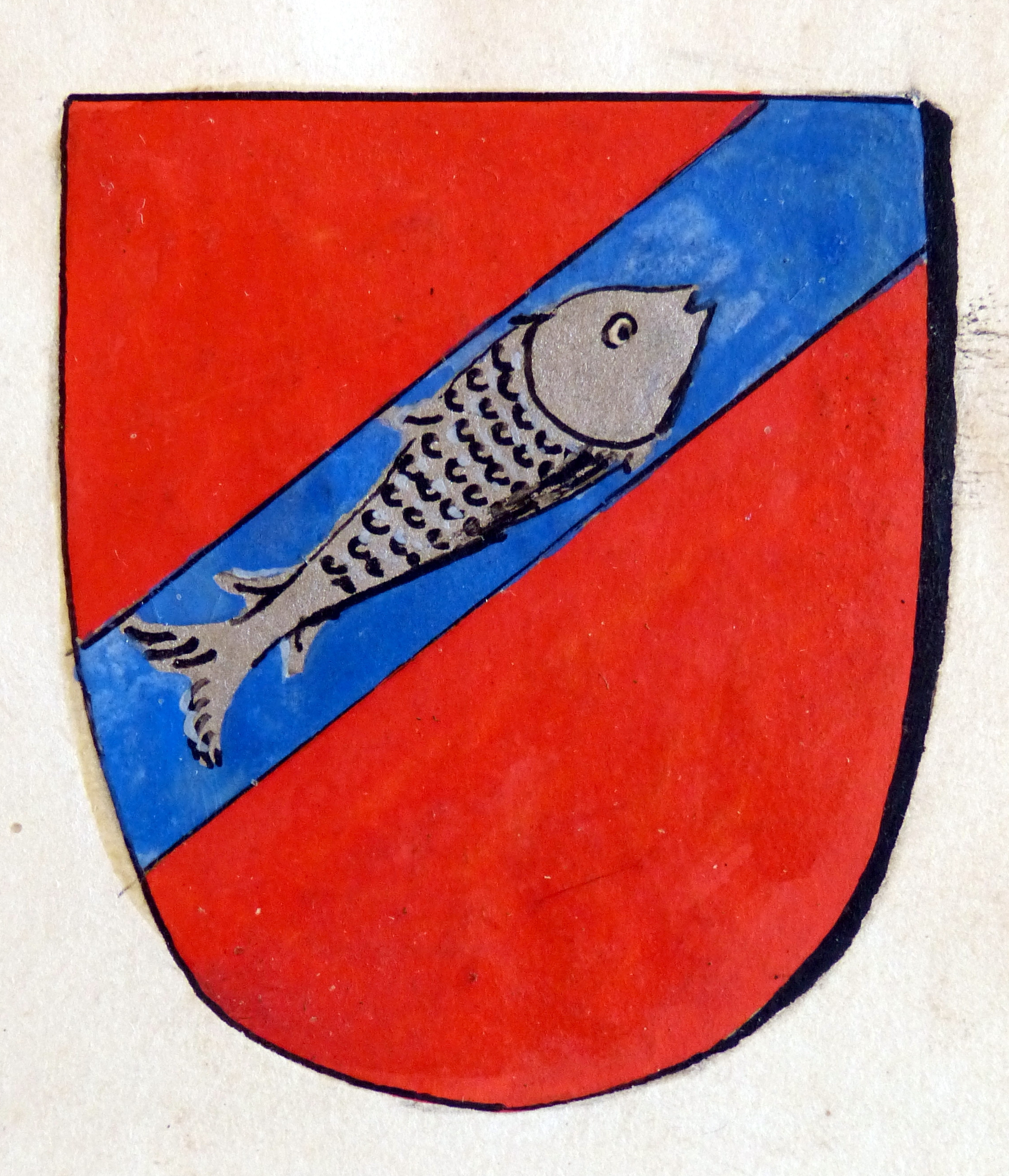
the coat of arms of Alt von Altenau

In 1600 Raitenau vested Salome with the noble title von Altenau. Her old family home changed hands; Johann Stainhauser wrote that in 1605, on 18 August, Friedrich Rechlinger, married to Maria Alt, a second cousin of Salome, bought her old parental house in Sigmund-Haffner Alley and added it to his buildings (he also demolished the old mint in the Kirchengassen, replacing it with a large building extending to the church itself). In 1606 Raitenau built a shared retreat for them erected outside the Salzburg city walls, Schloss Altenau, which later was rebuilt as Mirabell Palace by his nephew and successor Mark Sittich von Hohenems. This became a favourite refuge of Altenau. On 28 August 1609 she was ennobled by the Holy Roman Emperor, Rudolf II in Prague. Her children were relieved of their illegitimacy. A reflective and friendly balanced character, uninterested in politics, Salome was a haven of peace for her partner stuck in increasing internal and external conflicts. Despite her position as the archbishop's mistress, she was said to have no enemies at the Salzburg court throughout her life. Salome Alt and her children were given the freedom of the Salzburg estate on 24 May 1610, freeing them from the obligations and duties of commoners, and freeing them from the city administration. In 1610, Raitenau gave her Schloss Seehaus, in Rupertiwinkel. Through Raitenau's gifts and purchases in the archbishopric of Salzburg, Salome Alt's assets reached the enormous value of more than 400,000 guilders, assessed in an inventory of 31 October 1610. The annual income from her 80 businesses (farms, farmsteads, inns, mills, fields, and wood-cutting rights) amounted to over 200 guilders. In 1612 she waived her rights to 120,000 guilders in debt obligations from the Tirol in favour of the Salzburg cathedral chapter.

=== Raitenau's downfall ===
Raitenau found himself in dispute with the neighbouring duke of Bavaria, Maximilian I. This led to military confrontations over the salt trade, culminating in an invasion by the Bavarians in 1611. Deserted by his cathedral chapter and abandoned by Emperor Rudolf II, Raitenau packed off his family to the Ansitz Thurnhof in Flachau for safety, and fled the Salzburg court himself, seeking refuge at Kärnten. He was, however, captured by the Bavarians at Gmünd, and brought first to Hohenwerfen Castle, then Hohensalzburg Fortress where he was imprisoned by his successor, Mark Sittich von Hohenems. He remained at the latter, mostly in solitary confinement, until his death on 16 January 1617. His sufferings can be seen in graffiti scratched on the wall of his cell at Hohenwerfen: "Love is the beginning of suffering, sooner or later".

Salome Alt suffered a nervous breakdown following Raitenau's capture, from which she took a long time to recover. She was herself arrested on 27 October 1611 in Flachau, but was soon released on the instructions of the cathedral chapter. She fled to Wels in Austria to her cousin Felicitas Weiß (née Alt) who had married a merchant, Christoph Weiß. Here she waited in vain for "her lord". Though they were able to secretly communicate, the couple never met again. After Raiteneau's death in custody in 1617, she dressed in mourning like a widow for the rest of her life.

=== Life after Raitenau's death ===
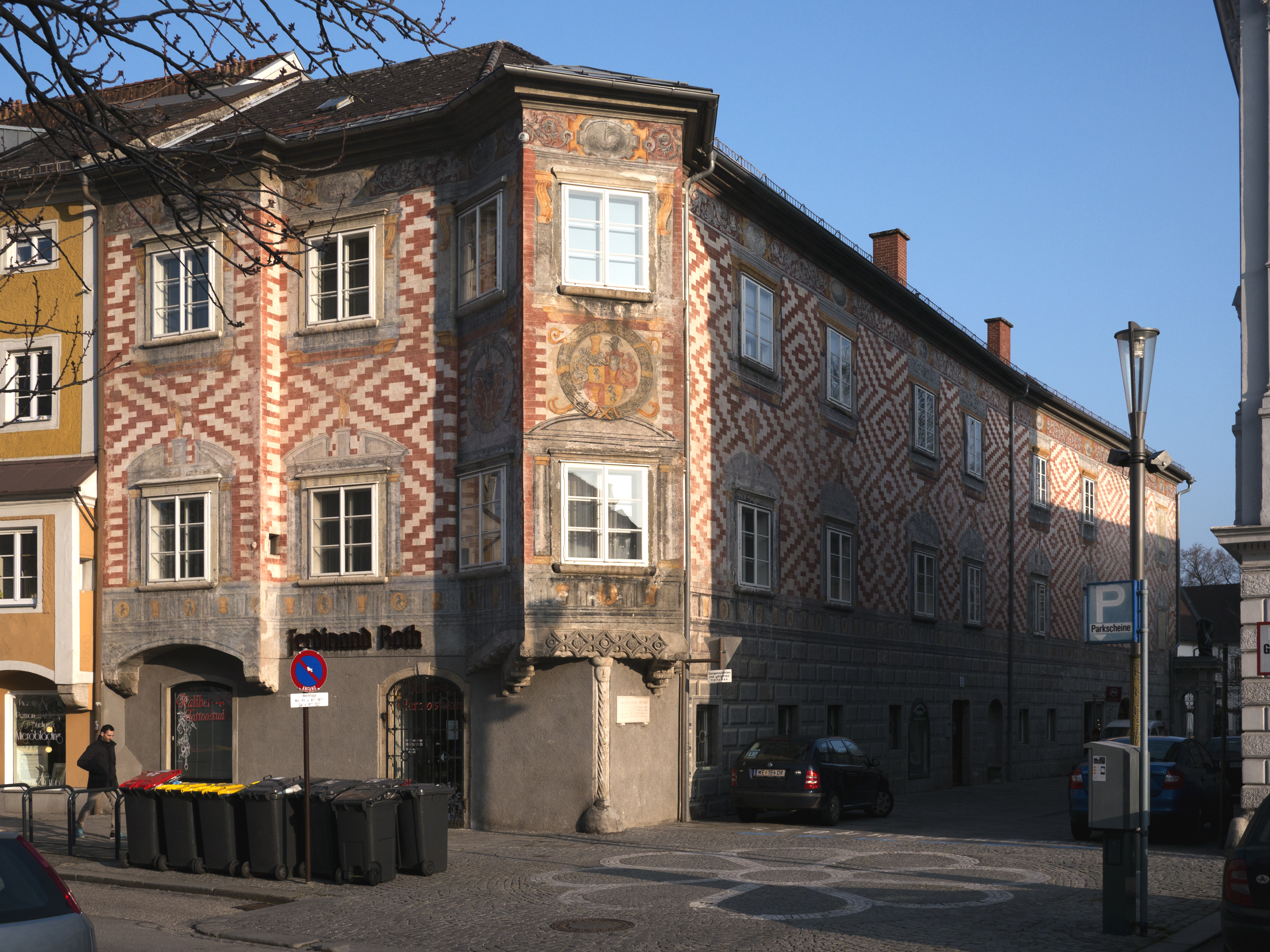
Salome Alt's house in Wels, Stadtplatz 24

In 1622 Salome Alt von Altenau bought a house in Wels, Stadtplatz 24, which still stands today, with its late gothic oriel bearing the three coats of arms of the Hofmann family, and its frescoes dating back to 1570. The house originally belonged to the Holy Roman Emperor Ferdinand I, and from 1552 had been the country residence of the von Hofmann family. Salome Alt died here on 27 June 1633, aged 64. The family name of Alt von Altenau died with Salome, as no male offspring carrying the name outlived her. Her sister inherited her property, and in 1668 the house in Wels was sold by her heirs to the Eiselsberg family. The site of her grave remains unknown.

== Portraits ==
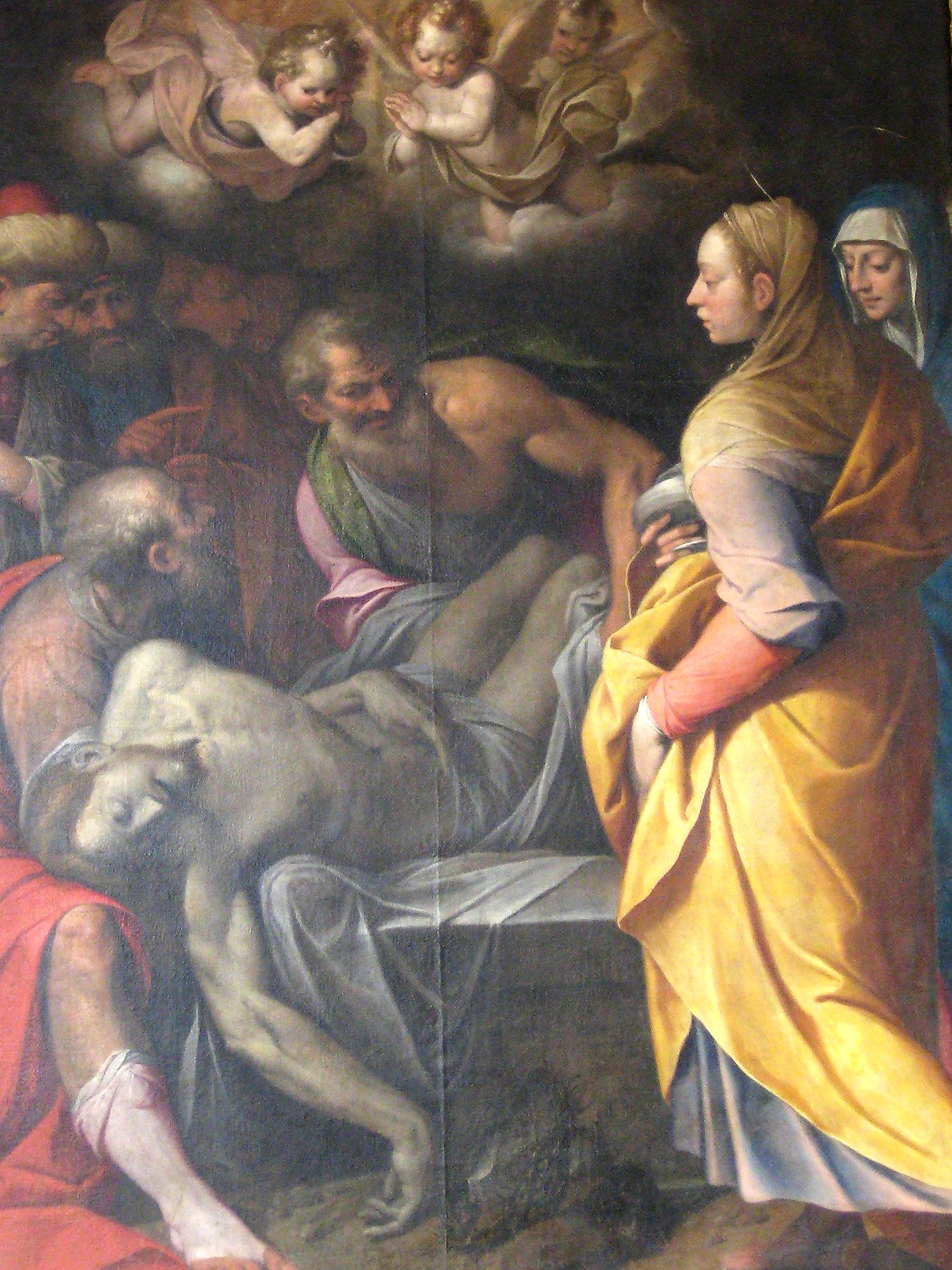
Salome Alt as Mary Magdalene

A painting by Camillo Procaccini (born 1546 in Bologna) showing the burial of Christ, depicts Salome Alt in the foreground as Mary Magdalene. This work was donated by Raitenau to the monastery of Langnau, the site of his family burial-place. It was later moved to the church in the neighbouring Hiltensweiler (today Tettnang, Baden-Württemberg).

The chapel erected for Hans Ulrich (II.) von Raitenau (1567–1622) to the north-west of the church of Mülln contains, on its east wall, a Christmas painting by Otto van Veen (early 17th Century) in which, according to tradition, Mary, the mother of God, and saint Joseph, are portraits of Salome Alt and Wolf Dietrich Raitenau.

== Salome Alt in literature ==
- Erwin H. Rainalter: Mirabell. Der Roman einer Frau. Paul Zsolnay, Vienna 1941.

== Literature ==
- Heinz Dopsch; Robert Hoffmann: Salzburg. Die Geschichte einer Stadt (2nd edition). Universitätsverlag Anton Pustet, Salzburg: 2008, ISBN 978-3-7025-0598-1.
- Eva Stahl-Botstiber: Salome Alt und das Frauenbild ihrer Zeit. In Salzburger Landesregierung Kulturabteilung (Publisher), "4. Salzburger Landesausstellung – Fürsterzbischof Wolf Dietrich von Raitenau – Gründer des barocken Salzburgs", pages 55–58. Salzburg: 1987.
- Siebmacher, Johann: Johann Siebmacher's Wappen-Buch. Vol. 28. Die Wappen des Adels in Salzburg, Steiermark und Tirol. Faksimile-Nachdruck der Ausgabe Nürnberg 1701–1806. Munich: Battenberg. Bauer & Raspe: Neustadt an der Aisch, 1979.
- Eva Stahl: Wolf Dietrich von Salzburg, Weltmann auf dem Bischofsthron. Amalthea, Vienna 1987, ISBN 3-85002-230-7.
- Sigrid-Maria Größing: Um Krone und Liebe. Die Macht der Geschichte. Amalthea, Vienna 2008, ISBN 978-3-85002-649-9.
