= Residenzgalerie =

Art gallery in Salzburg

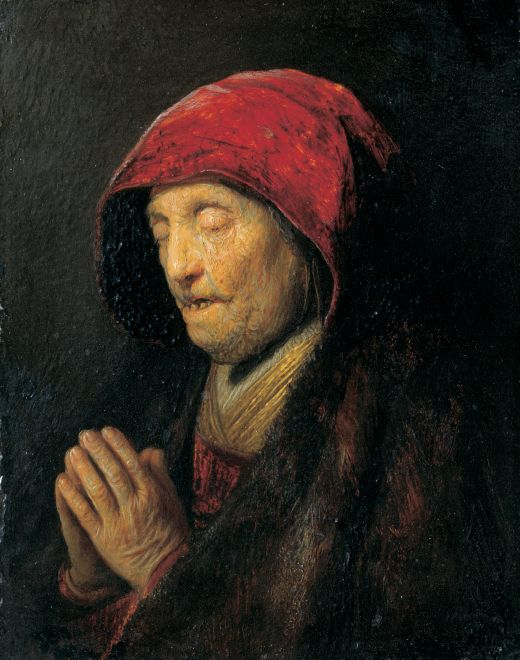
- Old Woman Praying (known as Rembrandt's Mother Praying) by Rembrandt
- Interactive fullscreen map
- Location: Salzburg, Austria
- Coordinates: 47°47′54″N 13°02′45″E

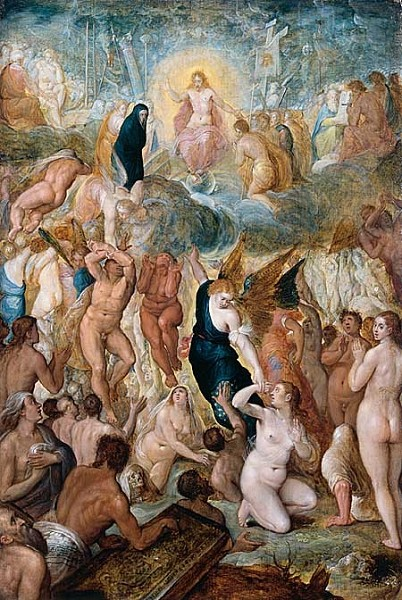
The Last Judgement by Hieronymus Francken II, 1605/1610

The Residenzgalerie is an art gallery in the Alte Residenz, Salzburg, Austria. Its collection includes works by Rembrandt, Carel Fabritius, Carlo Saraceni and Hieronymus Francken II.

== History ==
The state-owned Residenzgalerie provides a cross-section of painting from the 16th to the 19th centuries. It bears similarities with the extensive painting collection of Prince-Archbishop Hieronymus Colloredo, which was exhibited during his era (late 18th century) in rooms that are now the Residenzgalerie. After 1800, however, this collection was repeatedly plundered during the French Wars. In the age of the monarchy, many of the works were transferred from Salzburg to Vienna.

A new collection was proposed shortly after the First World War by a group of Salzburg artists, and the Residenzgalerie was opened in 1923. Apart from reinstating a permanent collection for Salzburg, the new gallery was also intended to be used by an art academy (never founded), encourage tourism, and provide a cultural attraction to go with the Salzburg Festival.

The centrepiece of the Residenzgalerie is the Czernin Collection. This was first exhibited at the gallery in 1954, initially on loan and then bought outright between 1980 and 1991. Its paintings by 17th-century artists are principally Dutch, but also Italian, Spanish and French. Assembled between 1800 and 1845, the collection's original owner was Count Johann Rudolf Czernin von und zu Chudenitz, who studied law in Salzburg and was related to Archbishop Hieronymus Colloredo. Also important are a number of works from the collection of Friedrich Karl, Count Schönborn-Buchheim (1674–1746), featuring mostly Dutch and Italian artists of the 17th century, which the gallery acquired on permanent loan in 1956.

== Network ==
The Residenzgalerie is a member of "Private Art Collections", a group of collections in Europe which exchange artworks and co-operate on joint exhibitions and other events. Other members include the Liechtenstein Museum in Vienna, the Academy of Fine Arts Vienna, and the Museo Poldi Pezzoli in Milan.
