= Wolf Dietrich von Raitenau =

Prince-archbishop of Salzburg between 1587 and 1612

His Grace Wolf Dietrich von Raitenau
- Prince-Archbishopric of Salzburg
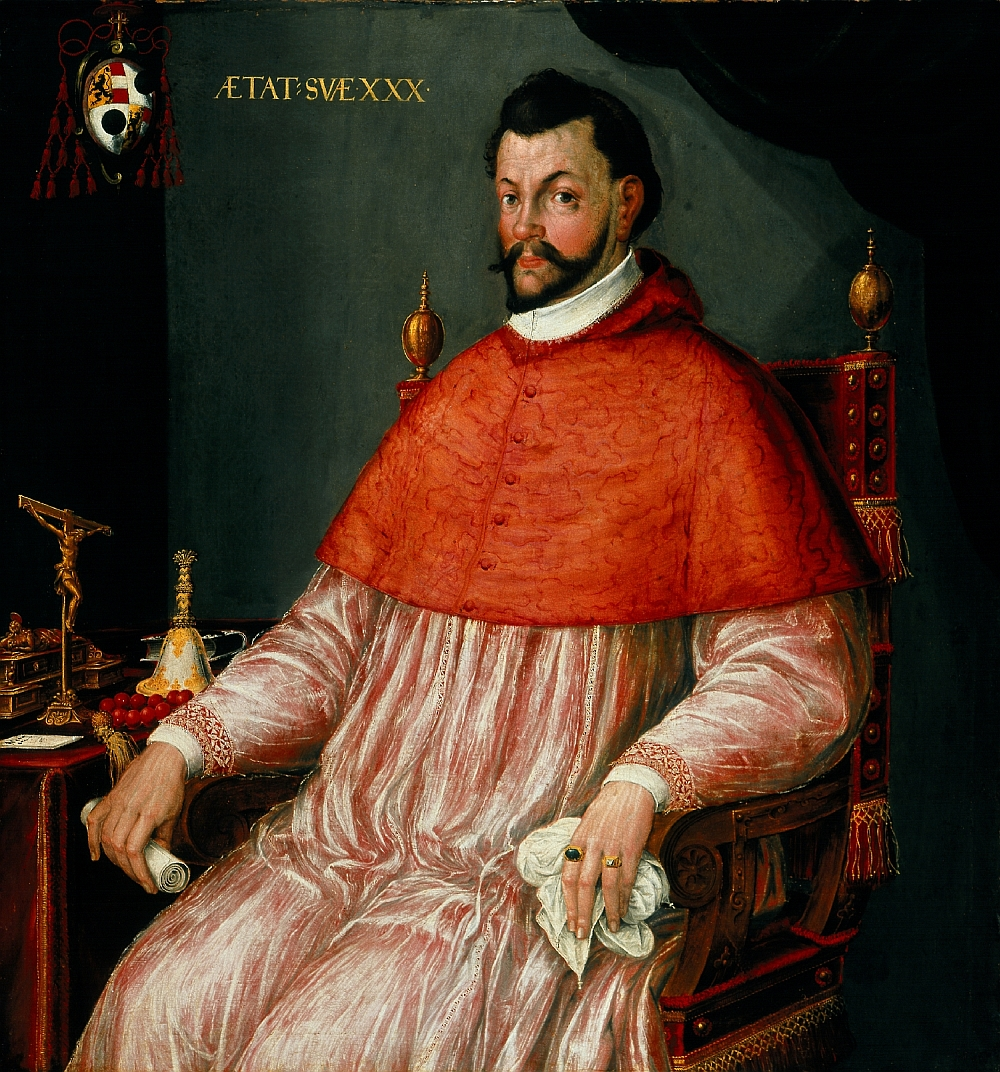
- 1589 painting of Raitenau with coat of arms in top left.
- Church: Roman Catholic Church
- Archdiocese: Salzburg
- Installed: 1587
- Term ended: 7 March 1612

Orders
- Ordination: 15 October 1587
- Consecration: 18 Oct 1587 by Urban von Trennbach

Personal details
- Born: 26 March 1559
- Died: 16 January 1617 (age 57)

Wolf Dietrich von Raitenau (26 March 1559 – 16 January 1617) was Prince-Archbishop of Salzburg from 1587 to 1612.

== Life ==
Raitenau was born at Hofen Castle in Lochau, near Bregenz in Further Austria, the son of the Habsburg colonel Hans Werner von Raitenau (1525-1593) and Helene von Hohenems (1535-1586), a niece of Pope Pius IV and sister of Mark Sittich von Hohenems Altemps, who was consecrated Bishop of Constance in 1561, as well as sister-in-law of Cardinal Charles Borromeo.

Wolf Dietrich received an ecclesiastical education at the Collegium Germanicum in Rome and became a member of the Salzburg cathedral chapter in 1578. His predecessor, Archbishop George of Kuenburg, had long served as a coadjutor bishop and had found himself in constant conflict with the chapter. Upon his death in 1587, Raitenau was elected as a compromise candidate and was ordained by the Passau bishop Urban of Trennbach. He continued the harsh measures of the Counter-Reformation initiated by his predecessors, invited Franciscan and Augustinian friars, and in 1589 had all Protestants expelled from the city of Salzburg. In his later years, however, he developed a milder attitude and initiated reforms of the liturgy and the administration of the episcopal lands, which alienated the Roman Curia.

Perceptive, well-read, and a follower of Niccolò Machiavelli's ideas, Raitenau considered himself a genuine Renaissance prince of an absolutist state. He won fame not only as an art collector but also as a builder who significantly promoted the spread of the Baroque architecture north of the Alps: When Salzburg Cathedral was devastated by a fire on the night of 11 December 1598, he had plans set up for a lavish reconstruction by the Venetian architect Vincenzo Scamozzi, who also drew up a master plan for the adjacent Residenzplatz square and designed the Salzburg Residenz. The new cathedral was, however, erected under Raitenau's successor, Mark Sittich von Hohenems, and his architect, Santino Solari. In 1606 the archbishop had also a castle built for his mistress, Salome Alt, with whom he had fifteen illegitimate children; the castle later was converted into Mirabell Palace by his successor.

Raitenau's rule was brought down after he entered into a fierce dispute with his mighty neighbour, Duke Maximilian I of Bavaria: In 1609 the Archbishop refused to join Maximilian's Catholic League and in October 1611 his forces invaded the Berchtesgaden Provostry, which was also claimed by the Bavarian House of Wittelsbach. In the subsequent clashes of arms, Bavarian troops campaigned in Salzburg. Deserted by his cathedral chapter and abandoned by Emperor Rudolf II, Raitenau on his flight to Carinthia was captured, deposed and imprisoned for life by his nephew and successor, Mark Sittich von Hohenems, first at Hohenwerfen Castle and later in Hohensalzburg.
