= Mirabell Palace =

Historic building in Salzburg, Austria

Coordinates: 47°48′20″N 13°02′31″E

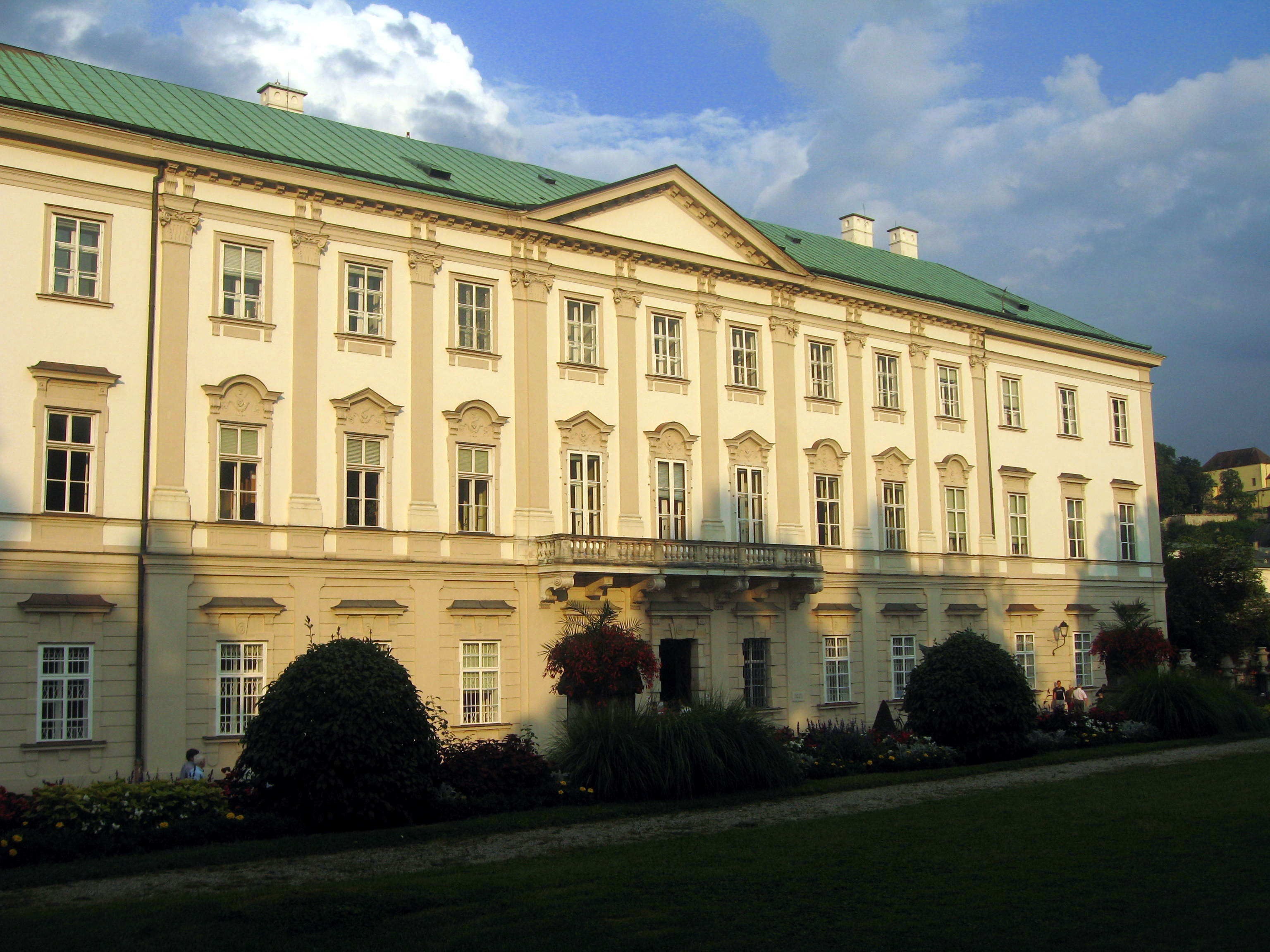
Mirabell Palace in Salzburg, Austria

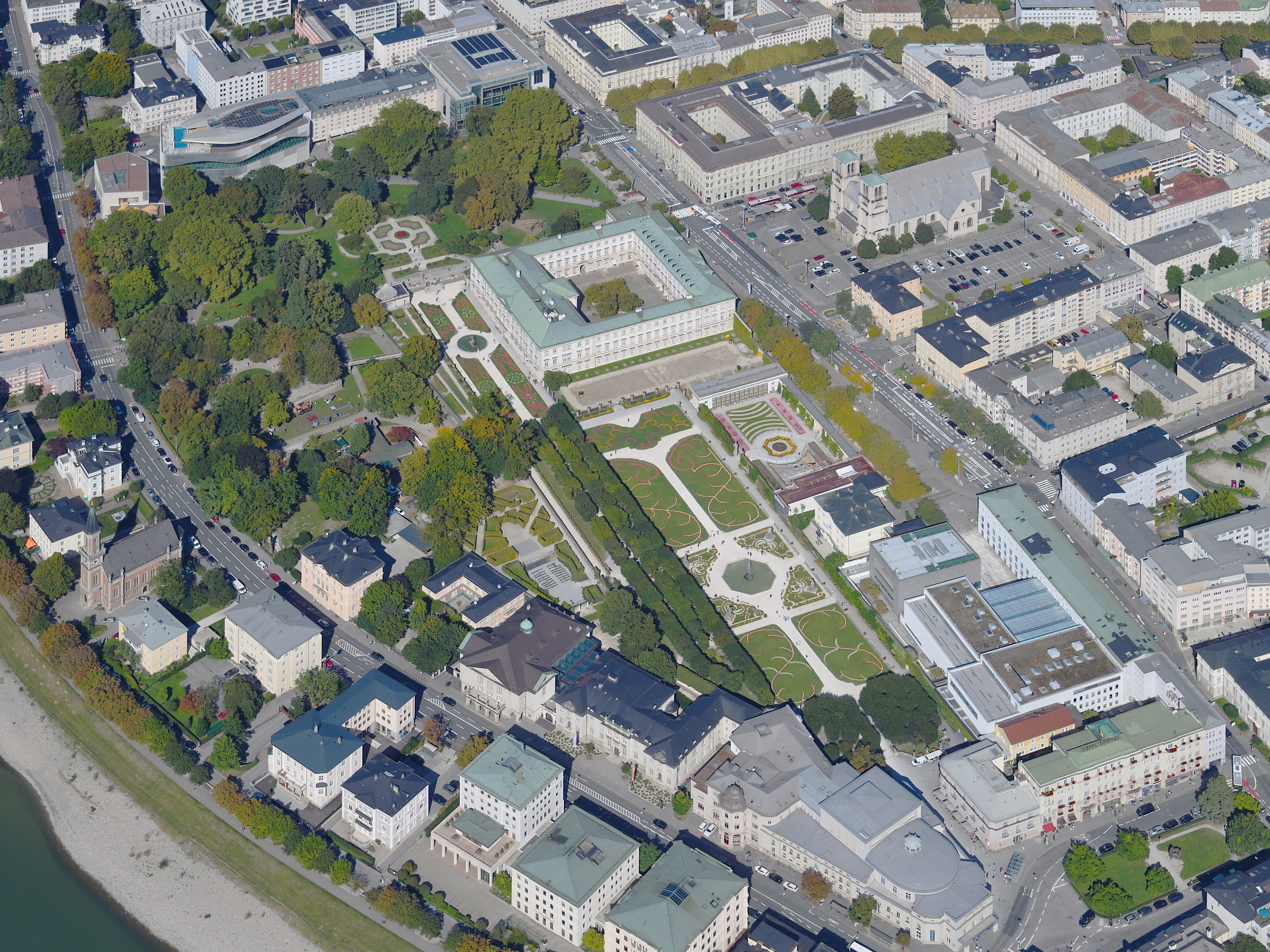
Aerial view of the palace and its gardens

Mirabell Palace (German: Schloss Mirabell) is a historic building in the city of Salzburg, Austria. The palace with its gardens is a listed cultural heritage monument and part of the Historic Centre of the City of Salzburg UNESCO World Heritage Site.

== History ==
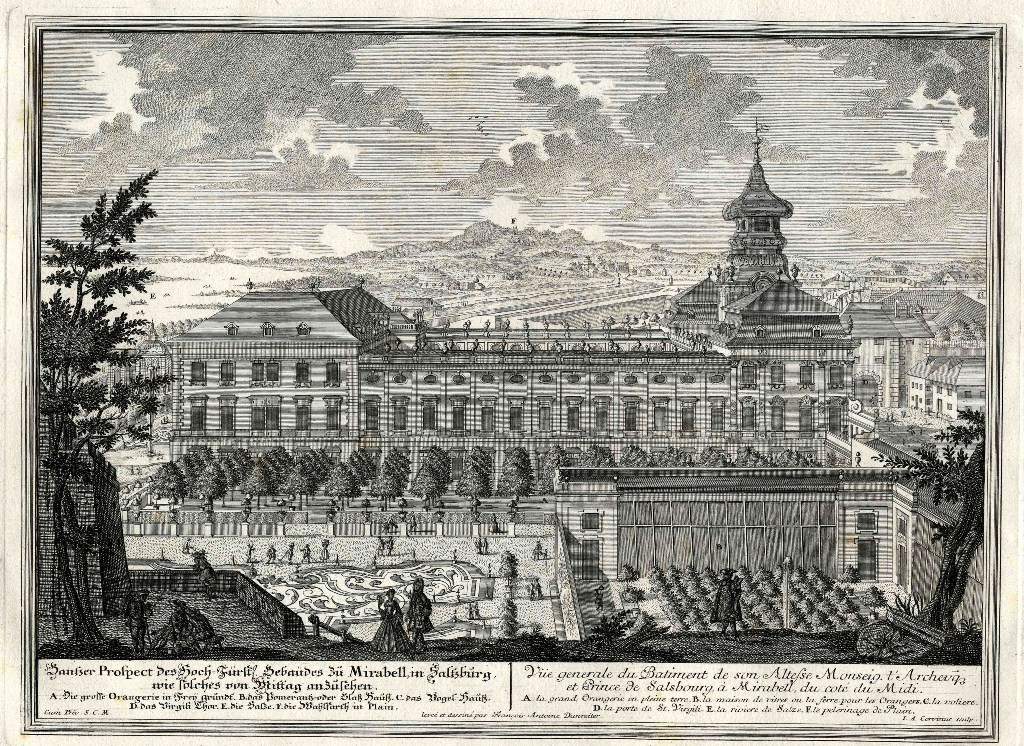
Mirabell Palace, c. 1735

The palace was built about 1606 on the shore of the Salzach river north of the medieval city walls, at the behest of Prince-Archbishop Wolf Dietrich Raitenau. The Archbishop suffered from gout and had a stroke the year before; to evade the narrow streets of the city, he decided to erect a pleasure palace for him and his mistress Salome Alt. Allegedly built within six months according to Italian and French models, it was initially named Schloss Altenau.

When Raitenau was deposed and arrested at Hohensalzburg Castle in 1612, his successor Mark Sittich von Hohenems expelled Salome Alt and her family from the premises. Mark Sittich gave the palace its current name from Italian: mirabile, bella: "amazing", "wonderful". It was rebuilt in a lavish Baroque style from 1721 to 1727, according to plans designed by Johann Lukas von Hildebrandt.

On 1 June 1815, the later King Otto of Greece was born here, while his father, the Wittelsbach crown prince Ludwig I of Bavaria served as stadtholder in the former Electorate of Salzburg. The current Neoclassical appearance dates from about 1818, when the palace was restored after a blaze. Archbishop Maximilian Joseph von Tarnóczy resided here from 1851 to 1863. The father of Hans Makart worked here as a chamberlain. Joachim Haspinger (1776–1858), Capuchin priest and a leader of the Tyrolean Rebellion, spent his last year in a small flat.

The palace was purchased by the City of Salzburg in 1866. After World War II, it began being used for the mayor's office and several departments of the municipal administration.

== Marble Hall ==
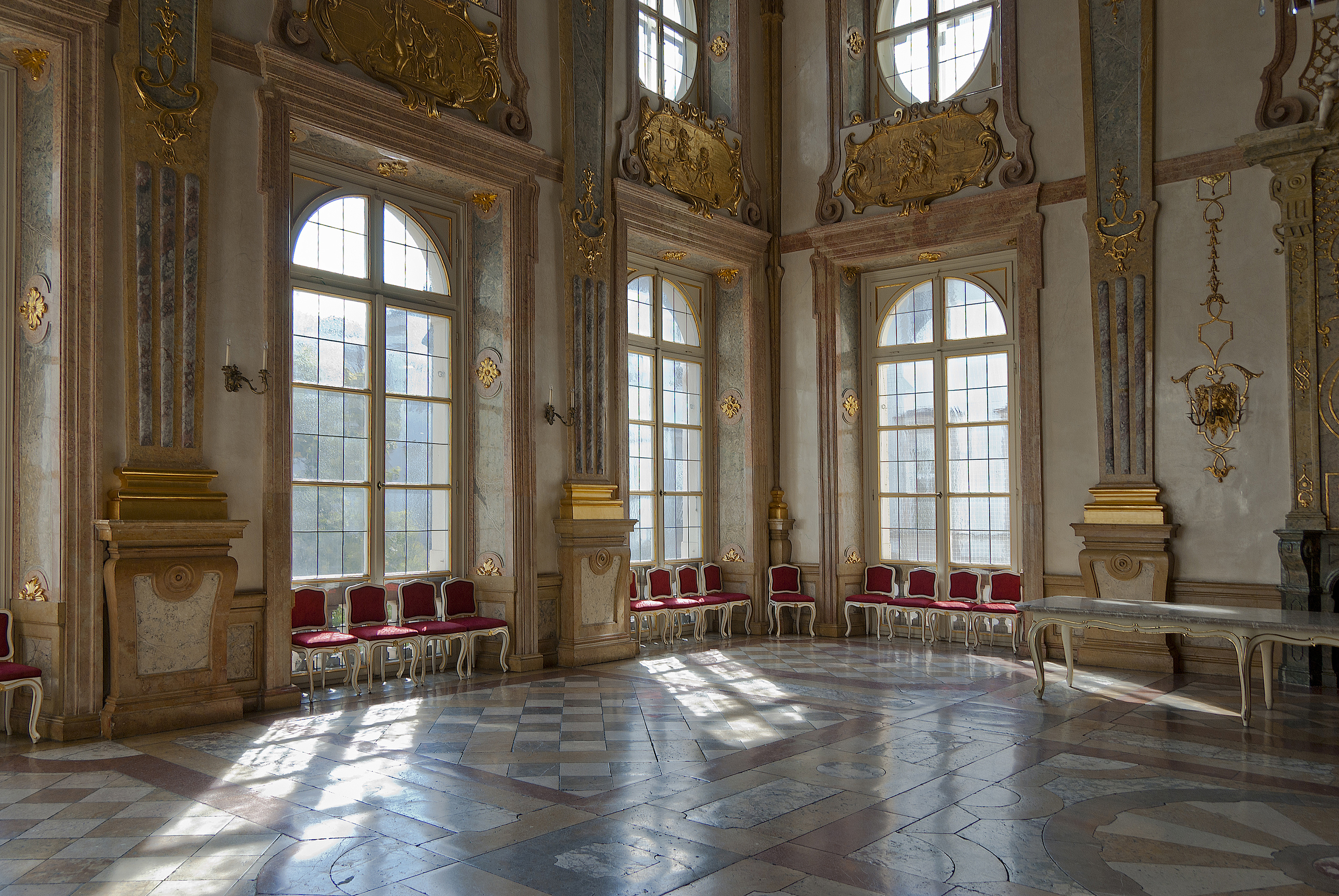
Marble Hall

The Marble Hall of Mirabell Palace is the venue of the "Salzburg Palace Concerts" (German: Salzburger Schlosskonzerte), directed by Luz Leskowitz. It is also a popular location for weddings.

On 3 June 1944, Gretl Braun, the sister of Eva Braun (later to marry Adolf Hitler), married SS-Gruppenführer Hermann Fegelein, who served as Reichsführer-SS Heinrich Himmler's liaison officer on Hitler's staff. Their wedding took place at Mirabell Palace with Hitler, Himmler, and Martin Bormann as witnesses. Her sister Eva made all the wedding arrangements.

== Gardens ==
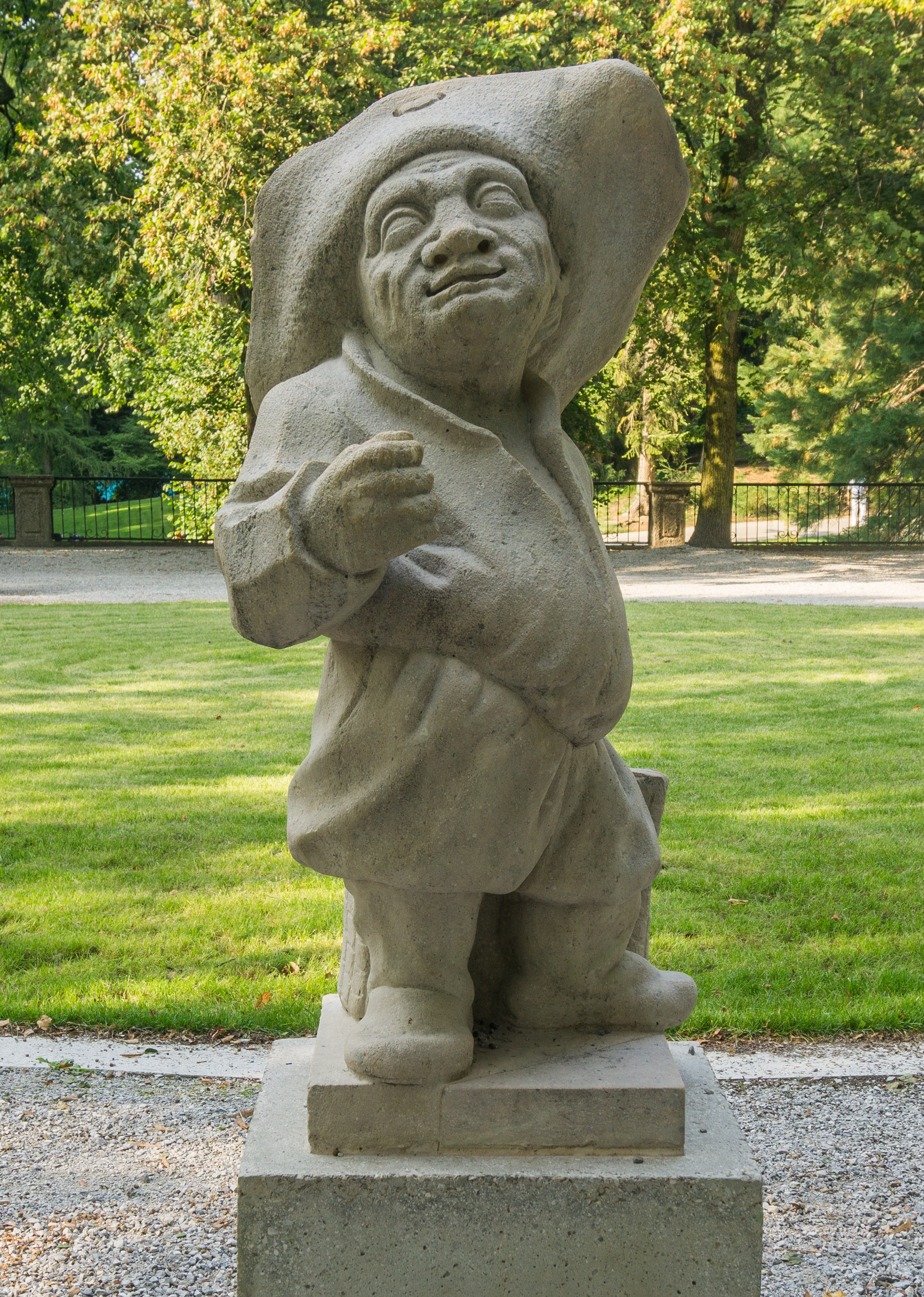
One of the dwarf statues inside the Dwarf Garden

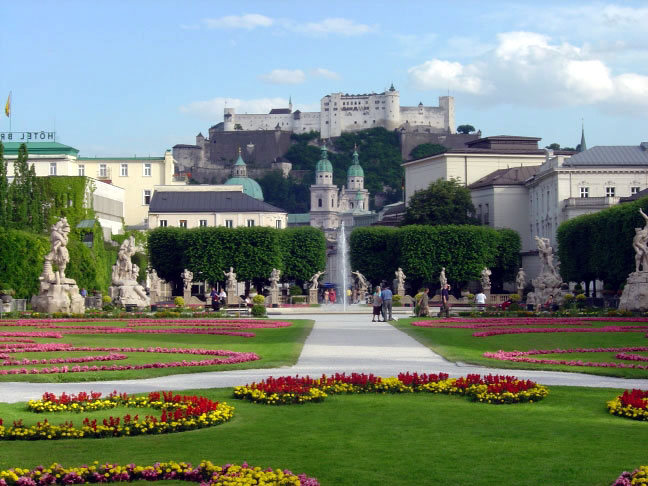
Mirabell gardens, looking toward Hohensalzburg Fortress

The Mirabellgarten was laid out under Prince-Archbishop Johann Ernst von Thun from 1687 according to plans designed by Johann Bernhard Fischer von Erlach. In its geometrically-arranged gardens are mythology-themed statues dating from 1730 and four groups of sculpture (Aeneas, Hercules, Paris and Pluto), created by Italian sculptor Ottavio Mosto from 1690. It is noted for its boxwood layouts, including a sylvan theater (Heckentheater) designed between 1704 and 1718. An orangery was added in 1725.

The gardens were made accessible to the public under Emperor Franz Joseph I of Austria. Up to today, it is one of the most popular tourist attractions in Salzburg. Several scenes from The Sound of Music were filmed here. Maria and the children sing 'Do-Re-Mi' while dancing around the Pegasus fountain and using the steps as a musical scale.
