= Barbara Thenn =

Austrian merchant

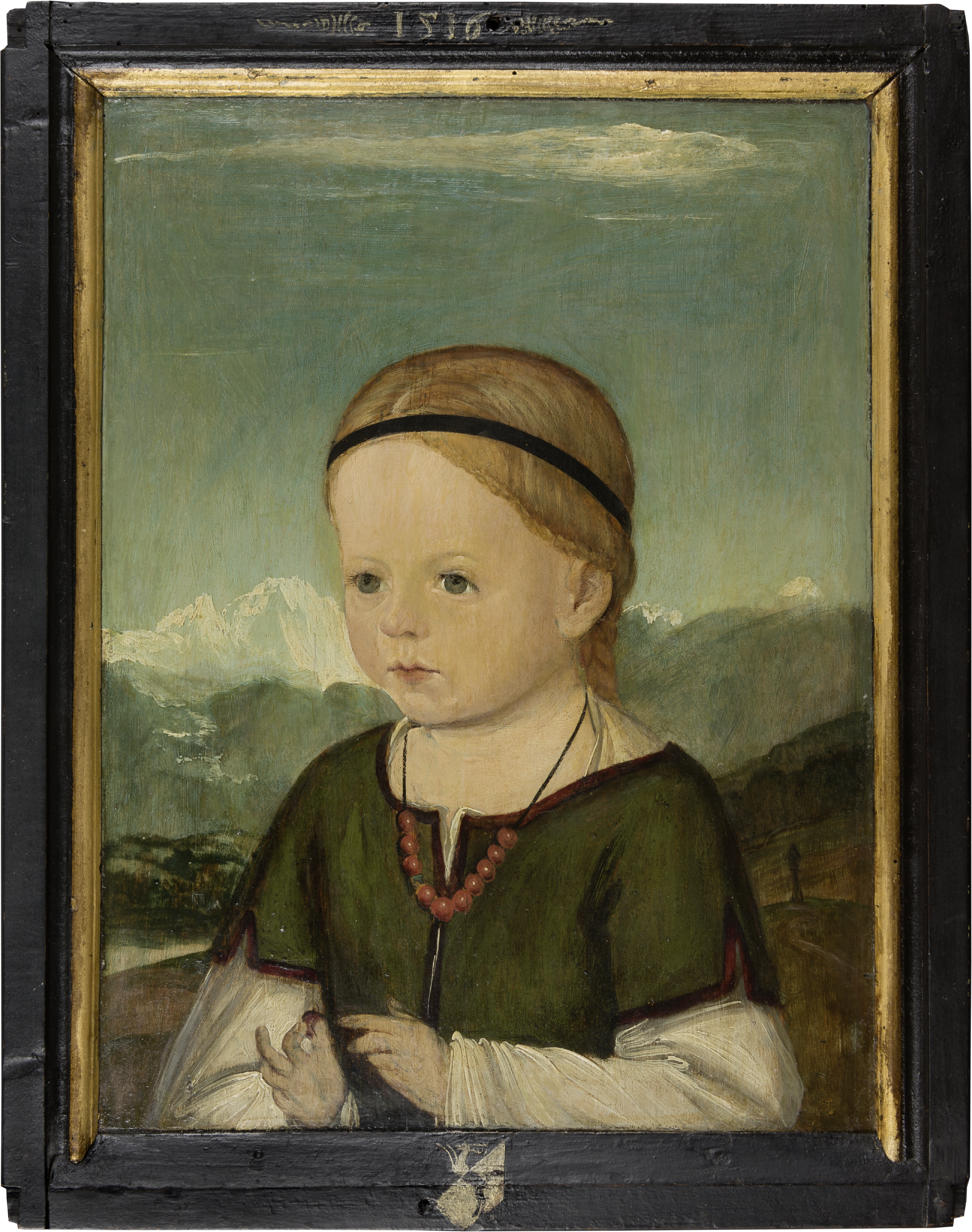
Portrait of Barbara Thenn (1513-1542)

Barbara Thenn (1519-1579) was an Austrian merchant and Münzmeister.

She was a member of the rich merchant family Alt of Salzburg, and the aunt of Salome Alt. She married Marx Thenn, Münzmeister of the Arch Bishopric of Salzburg. When her spouse died in 1552, she successfully applied to succeed him in his public office as Münzmeister. It was almost unique for a woman to have such an office. She managed the state coin workshop of Salzburg between 1552 and 1572. In addition, she also managed the iron works in Hammerau, and the silver and copper mines in Kitzbühel.

There is a memorial to Barbara Thenn in Salzburg.
