= Residenzplatz =

Square in the old city of Salzburg, Austria

Coordinates: 47°47′54″N 13°02′47″E

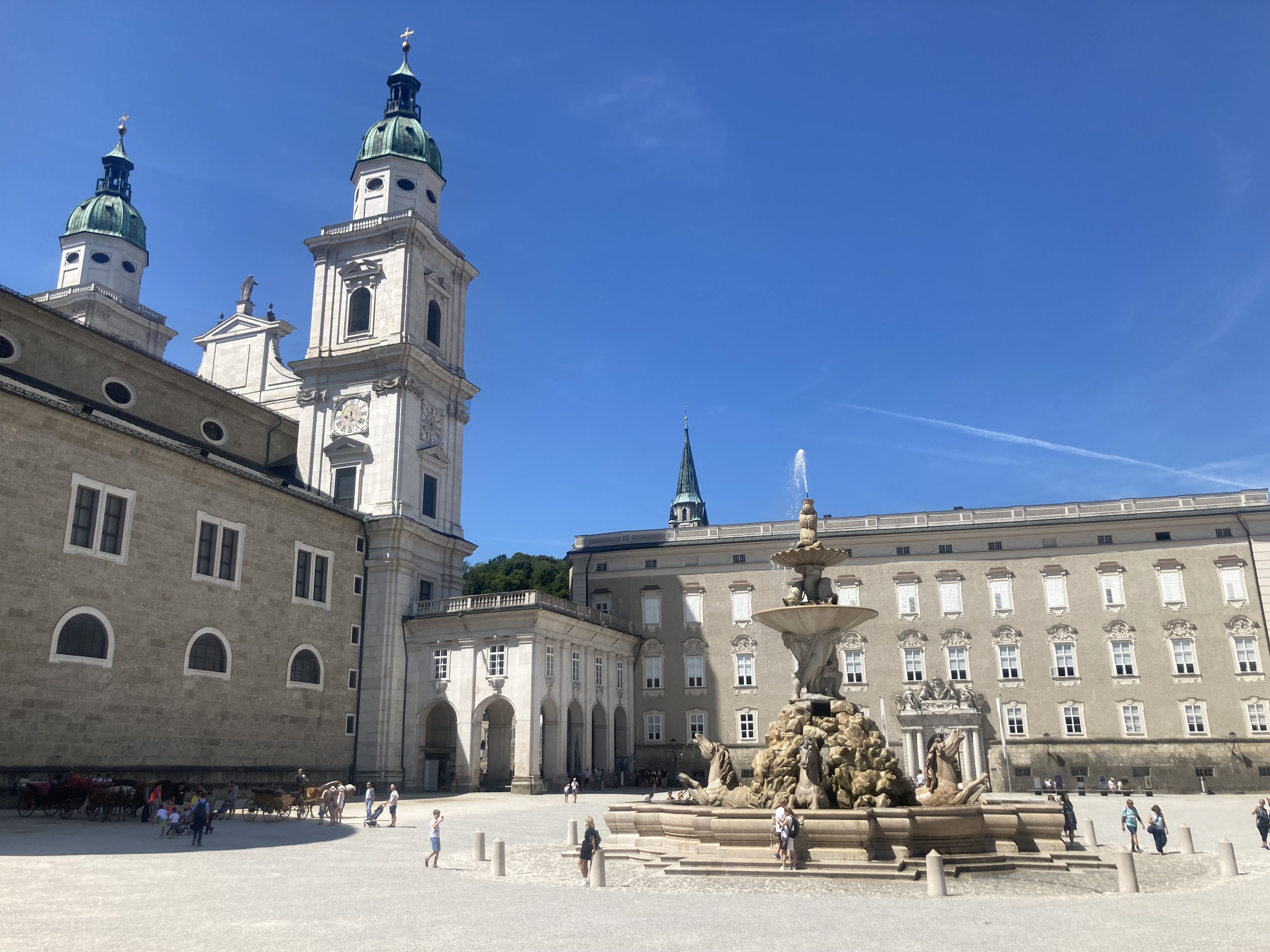
Salzburg Residenzplatz with Cathedral (left) and Alte Residenz (right)

Residenzplatz is a large, stately square in the historic centre (Altstadt) of Salzburg in Austria. Originally named Hauptplatz, it is now named after the Alte Residenz (Old Residence) of the Prince-Archbishops of Salzburg. It is one of the city's most popular places to visit.

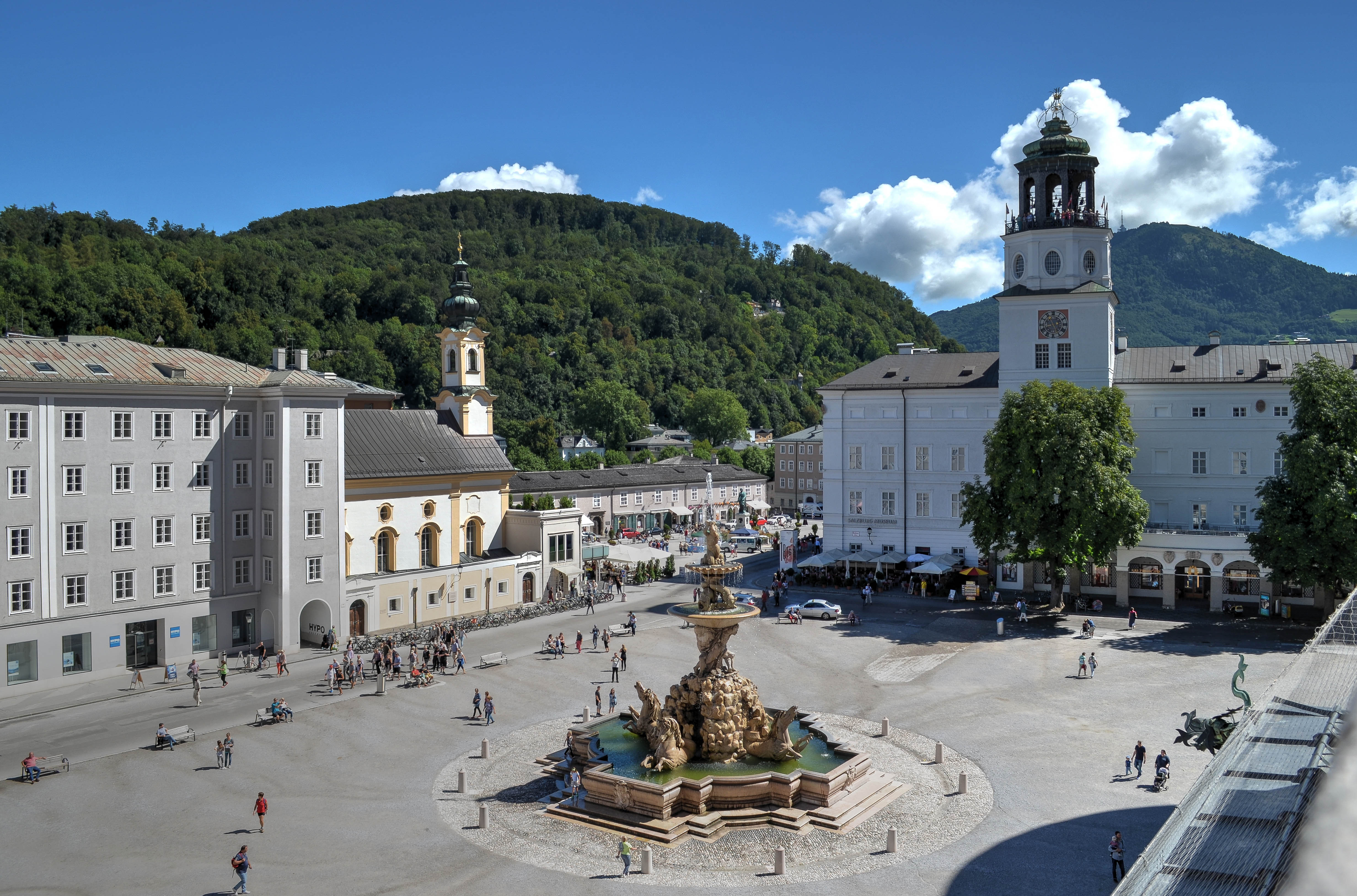
Neue Residenz (right) with Mozartplatz to its left

The Residenzplatz is enclosed by Salzburg Cathedral (Salzburger Dom) to the south and the Alte Residenz to the west. To the east is the Neue Residenz (New Residence), a Renaissance building erected from 1588 onwards, with its prominent bell tower. Several historic private houses (Bürgerhäuser) frame the square to the north, among them the temporary home of the Baroque painter Johann Michael Rottmayr at No. 2, where he stayed while creating the ceiling frescoes in the Alte Residenz around 1690. The adjacent Mozartplatz leads to Salzburg Museum.

== History ==
The Residenzplatz was laid out from 1587 onwards at the behest of Prince-Archbishop Wolf Dietrich von Raitenau, after he ordered the abandonment of the cemetery of the former monastery that previously lay to the north of Salzburg Cathedral. Remnants of the medieval cemetery were recently discovered underneath the square's surface. Raitenau also had a large number of private houses demolished to provide space. Then called Hauptplatz (Main Square), the new public plaza coincided with the reconstruction of Salzburg Cathedral, according to plans laid out by the Italian architect Vincenzo Scamozzi.

Currently, the square is about to be refurbished, including a new paving and a monument commemorating a Nazi book burning conducted at the site on 30 April 1938.

== Fountain ==
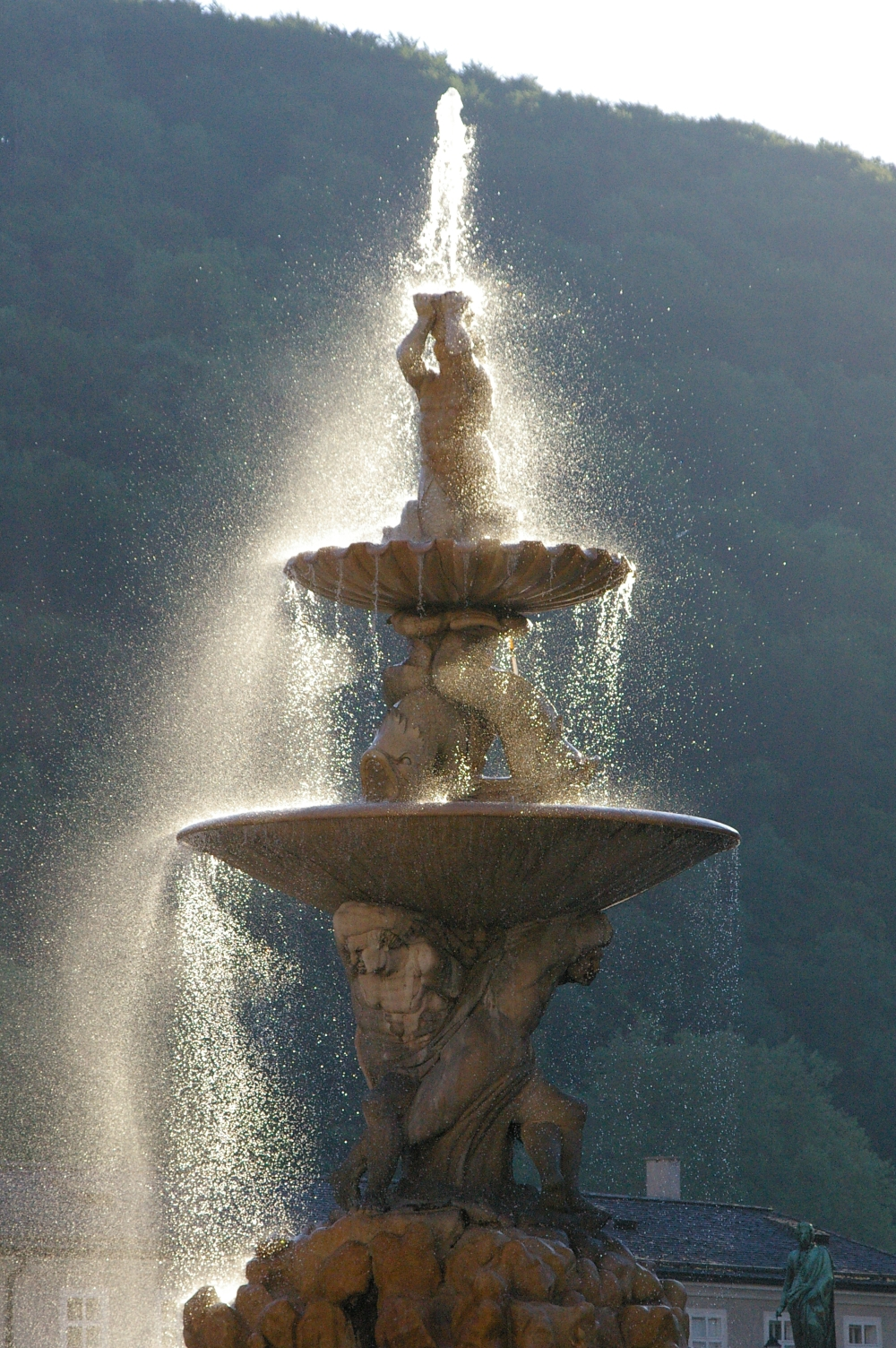
Residenzbrunnen

The Residenzbrunnen in the centre of the square was designed by Tommaso di Garona and erected between 1656 and 1661. The upper basin is topped by a Triton statue ejecting the waters upwards. It is made of Untersberg limestone (Untersberger Marmor). It is considered the largest Baroque fountain in Central Europe.

== Events ==
The square hosts regular events:

- Open air cinema: Every summer in July and August the square is transformed into an open-air cinema. Typically, taped performances of the Salzburg Festival are shown
- Annual kermesse (Kirtag) celebrating the feast of Saint Rupert on September 24
- Salzburg Christmas market during Advent.

In the 1980s and 1990s, several rock concerts by Joe Cocker, Tina Turner, Neil Young, and others were held on Residenzplatz.
