= Salzburg Residenz =

Palace in Salzburg, Austria

Coordinates: 47°47′54″N 13°02′45″E

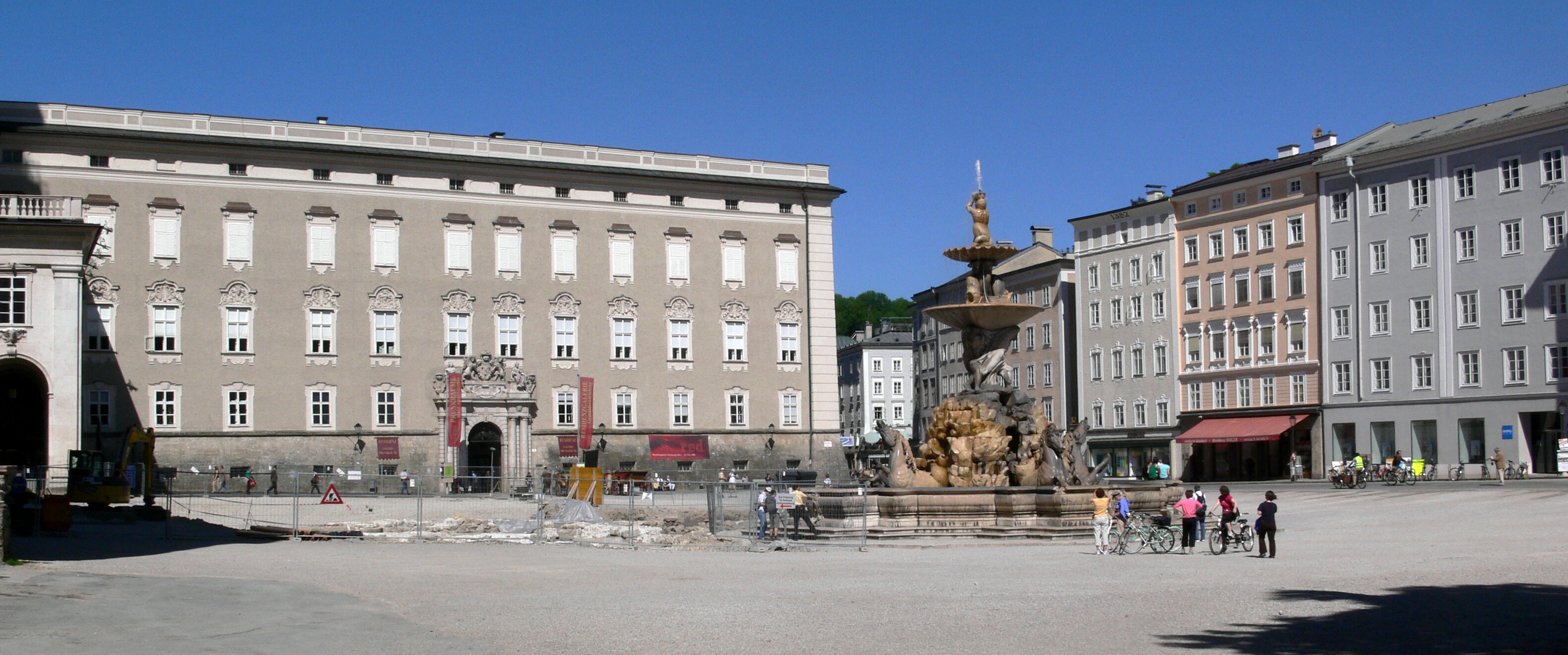
Salzburg Residenz facade on Residenzplatz

The Salzburg Residenz, also known as the Alte Residenz or Old Residence, is a palace located at Domplatz and Residenzplatz in the historic centre (Altstadt) of Salzburg, Austria. First mentioned about 1120, for centuries the Prince-Archbishops of Salzburg resided at the Residenz and used the palace to present and represent their political status. Today the Salzburg Residenz palace houses an art gallery, known as the Residenzgalerie, and is one of the most impressive attractions in the city.

The Residenz should not be confused with the nearby Neue Residenz or New Residence, which is situated on the opposite side of Residenzplatz and houses the Salzburg Museum.

== History ==
The earliest recorded reference to the bishop's palace was in a document dated around 1120. Construction began under Archbishop Conrad I, when he relocated his residence from St Peter's Abbey to its present site close to Salzburg Cathedral.

In the sixteenth century, several changes and additions to the structure were made. The bishop's palace took on its present Renaissance appearance under the auspices of Archbishop Wolf Dietrich Raitenau between 1587 and 1612, probably according to plans designed by the Italian architect Vincenzo Scamozzi. In the early seventeenth century, work began on the south wing, which included the addition of the large staircase and the Carabinieri-Saal, a section that connected the palace to the Franciscan Church and a large courtyard.

The successors of Wolf Dietrich continued to expand and refine the palace through to the end of the eighteenth century. The Residenzplatz façade as well as the interiors were altered with Baroque elements designed by Johann Lukas von Hildebrandt and paintings by Johann Michael Rottmayr. Throughout the centuries up to the rule of the last prince-archbishop Hieronymus von Colloredo (1772–1803), the palace served as archiepiscopal residence, as well as a place of public gatherings and state affairs, all taking place in a setting that reflected power and grandeur.

Upon Salzburg's secularisation in 1803, the Residenz building served as a domicile of the Austrian imperial dynasty, as for Emperor Francis' widow Caroline Augusta of Bavaria, and of the Habsburg-Tuscany branch. After World War I, a plan to assemble an art gallery was proposed by the Residenzmuseum. Planning for the Residenzgalerie was completed in 1922 by the official curator of Salzburg, Eduard Hütte. In 1923, the Residenzgalerie was opened, intended to replace the art collection of the prince-archbishops, which had been lost during the Napoleonic wars in the early nineteenth century. It was also intended to support a planned academy of art, as well as promote tourism. Today, the Residenzgalerie presents notable paintings from the sixteenth to the eighteenth century, as well as Austrian paintings from the nineteenth century.

== Wallistrakt ==
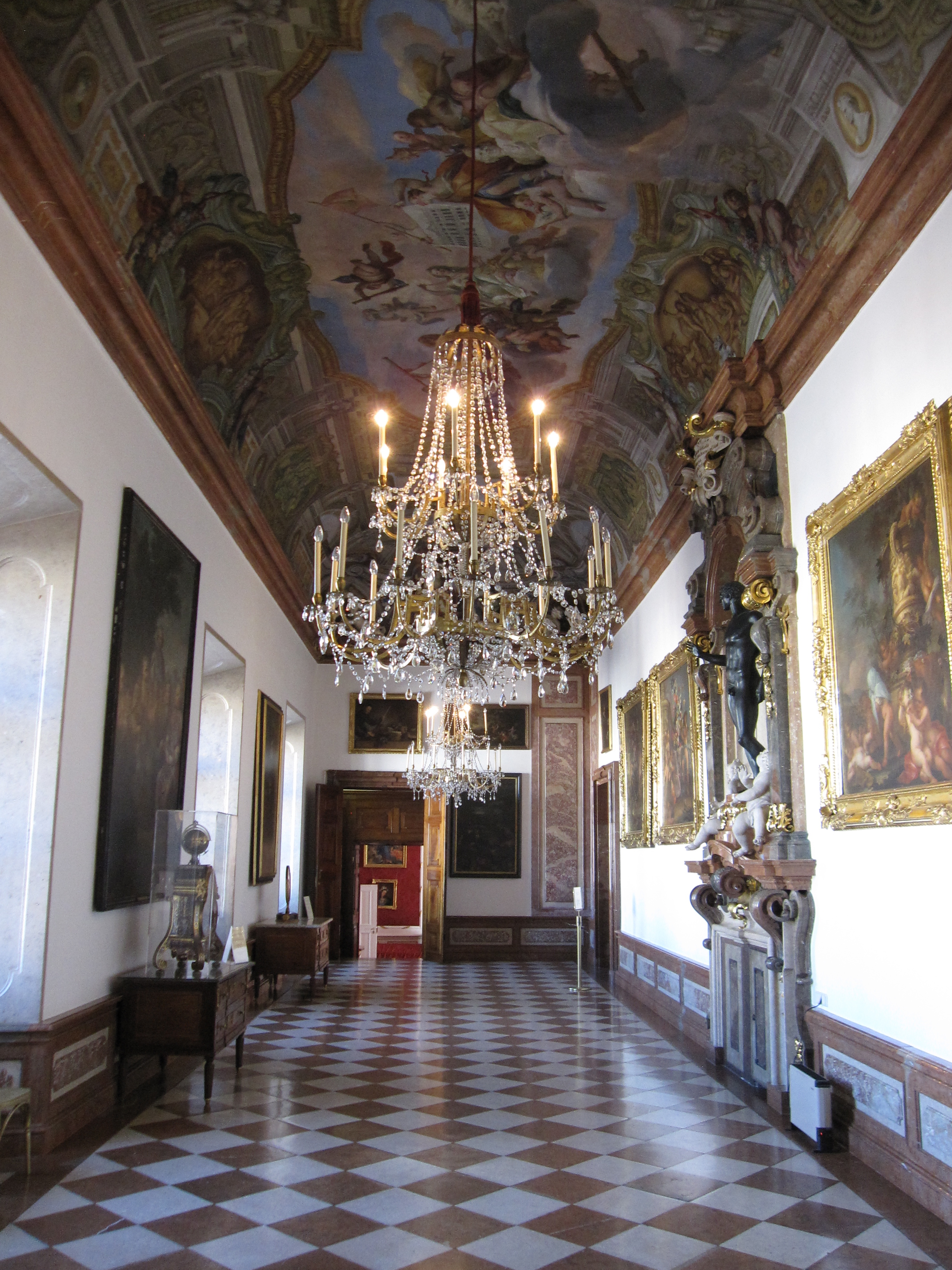
Bildergalerie at the Salzburg Residenz

The wing of the Salzburg Residenz called Wallistrakt is a part of its vast complex. It is a composition of various architectural components built during different construction stages. The apartment in the Wallistrakt has not been dealt with as a part of the prince-archiepiscopal residence in literature, due to several re-constructions and changes of proprietors.

The so-called Hofbogengebäude that was built during the first constructional stage, starting in 1604, was originally a place of accommodation for the apartment of Archbishop Wolf Dietrich Raitenau. It was put up in the medieval Frohnhof, the forecourt of the cathedral, where there was enough space to quickly build a new living unit for the prince archbishop without disturbing the procedures of the Residence or having to redeem civic houses. After the Hofbogengebäude was completed in 1606, the medieval Residence was open to further renovation and modernization.

To the north, the Hofbogengebäude was connected directly to the hall called Carabinieri-Saal, the sala grande of the Salzburg Residence. From there, the apartment on the second floor extended southwards to where the prince archbishop's private chambers were located in the very south of the building. A richly stuccoed staircase led from there to a garden hall, opening towards the garden called „Hofgärtl“ that was located in the west. This giardino segreto was surrounded by a high garden wall. The assignment to the hall as sala terrena, which today is not legible any more.

In literature, a connection between the Hofbogengebäude and the Venetian architect Vincenzo Scamozzi is repeatedly established. Scamozzi demonstrably stayed in Salzburg during 1603/1604 to draw up a project for Wolf Dietrich of Raitenau, including a new cathedral as well as the renovation and extension of the episcopal residence. Regardless, the five passages planned for the Hofbogengebäude could unmistakably be put in context with Scarmozzi's draft of the cathedral. However, there must have been a change of plan (or planner) during the building phase between 1604 and 1606, as it shows in the modification of the original sketch of the facade.

Already during under the tenure of Mark Sittich of Hohenems (1612–1619), Wolf Dietrich's successor, the Hofgärtl and the sala terrena must have been conveyed. At that time, trilateral cloisters with a storey on top were erected within the garden walls, and the sala terrena was walled in.

== Gallery ==
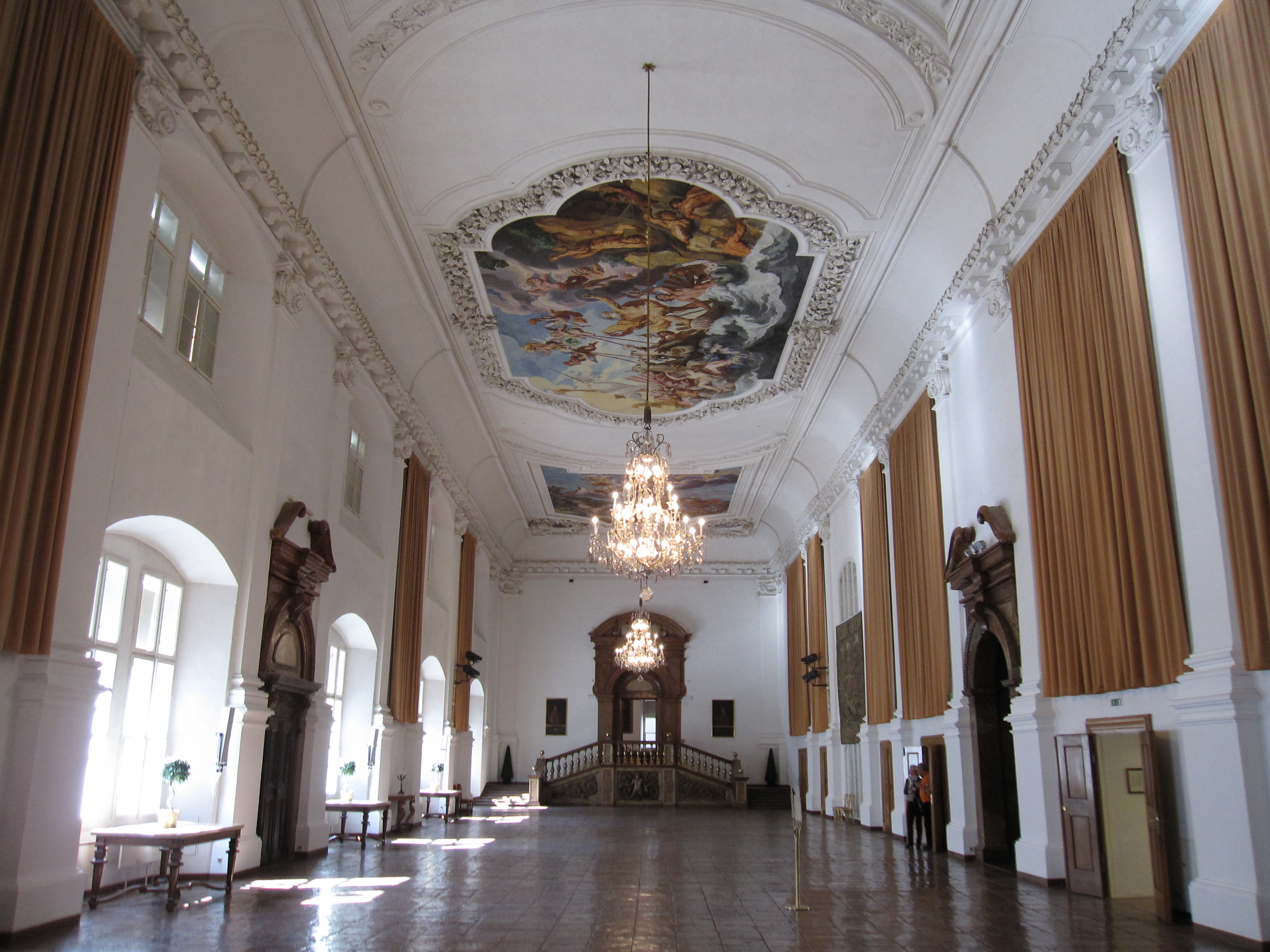
Carabinieri-Saal

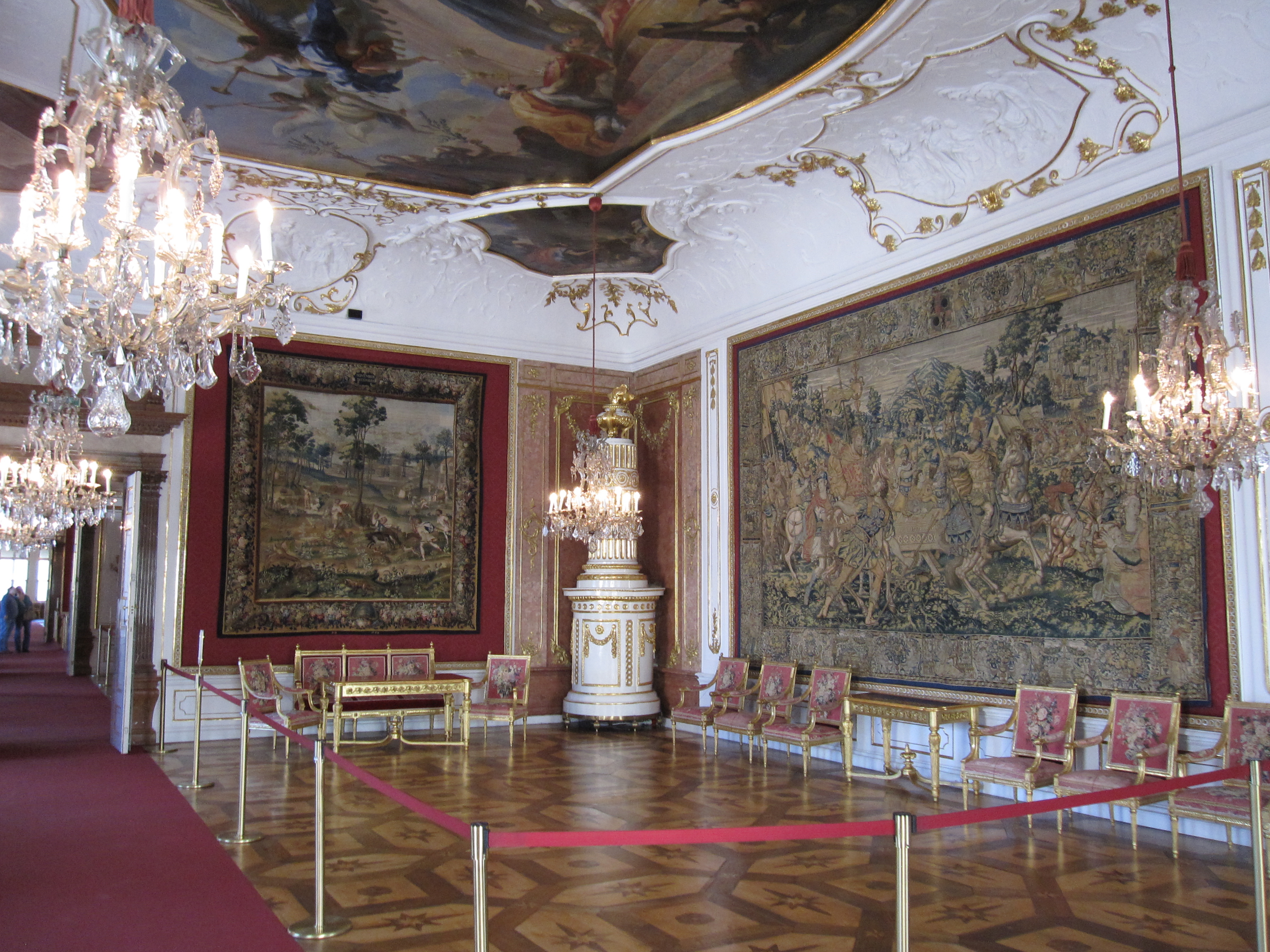
Audienz-Saal

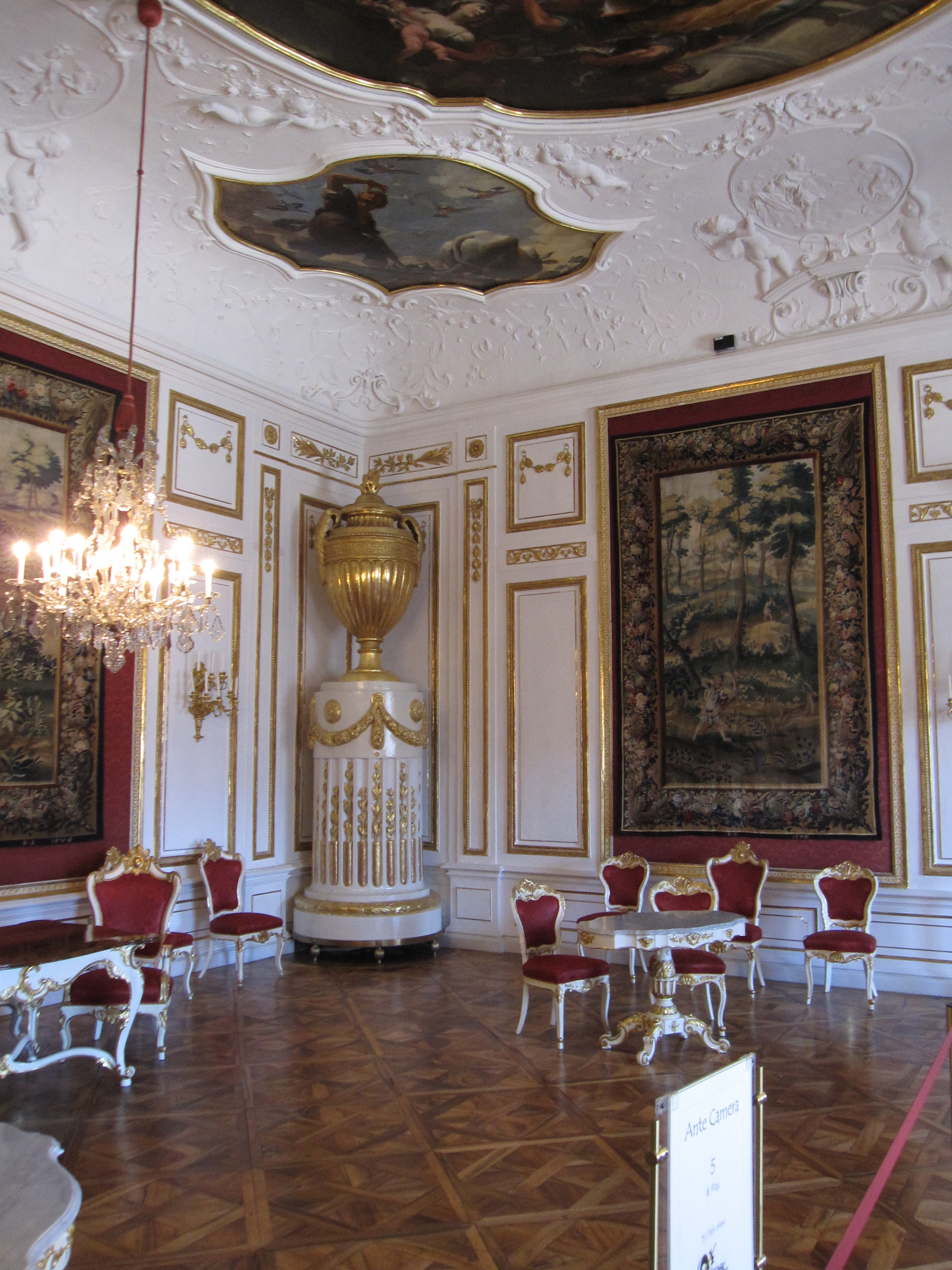
Ante Camera

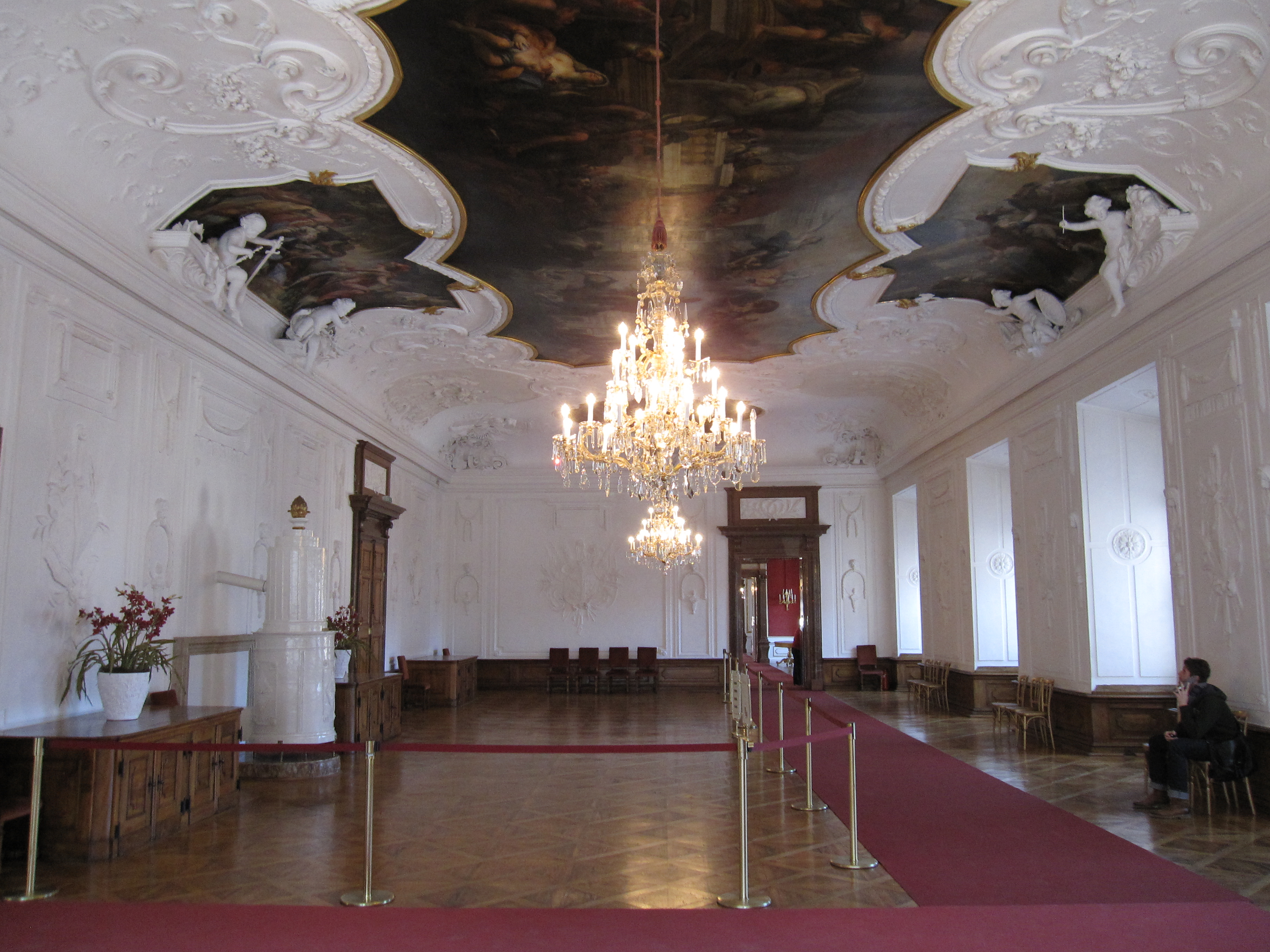
Ritter-Saal

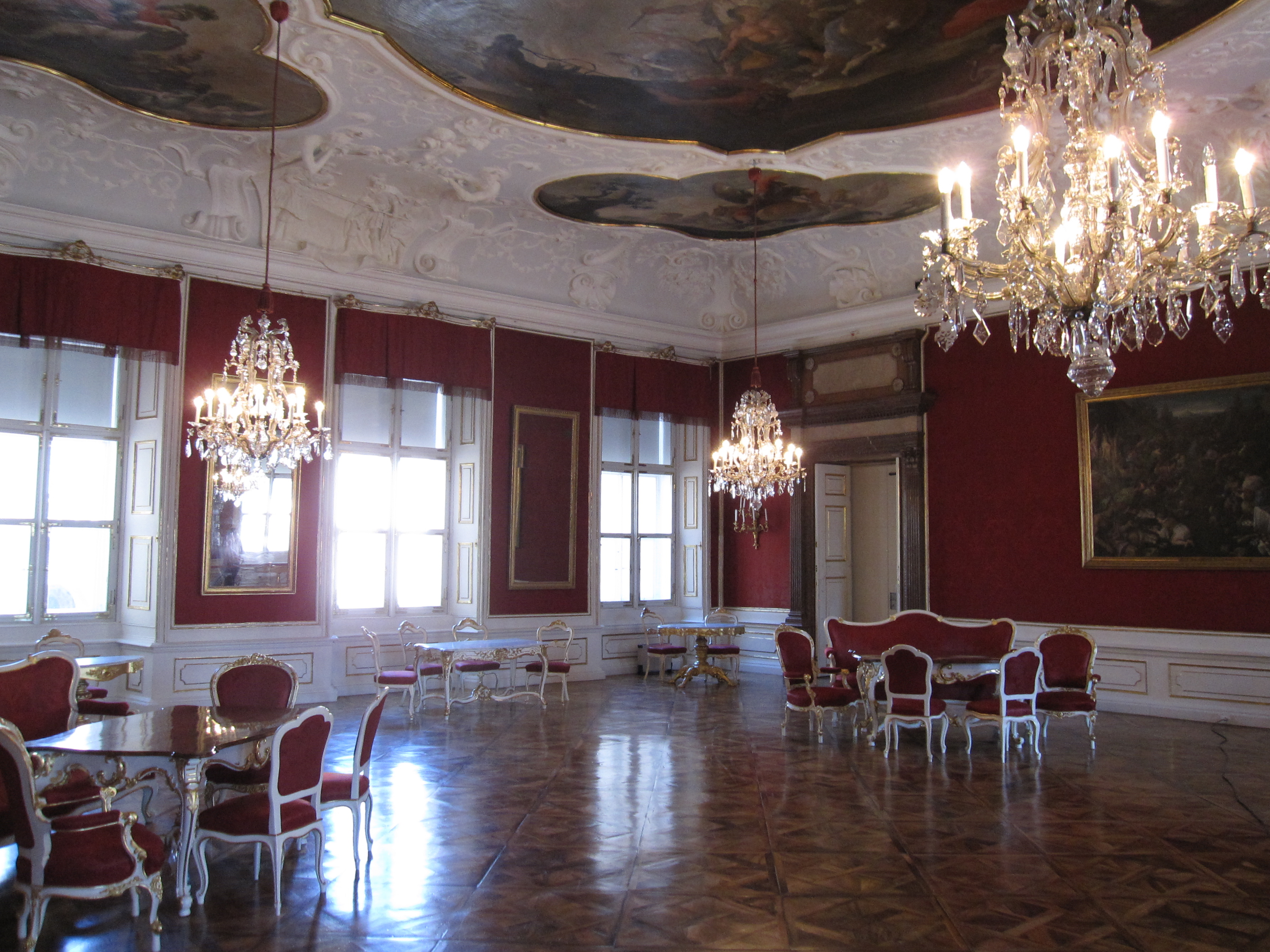
Konferenz-Saal
