= Franz Krieger =

Franz Krieger (1914–1993) was an Austrian businessman and photographer from Salzburg, Austria whose collection includes 35,000 photographs taken during the rise of Hitler, World War II, and the reconstruction afterwards.

Krieger photographed the Salzburg festival, including movie stars like Marlene Dietrich and Hans Albers, and the arrival of Hitler. He later photographed Kristallnacht, book burnings, and the boycott of Jewish businesses, as a freelance photographer and on the staff of Nazi magazines. During World War II, he was assigned as a photographer to a special propaganda unit on the Eastern front. He was sent back from the front because of illness, and so avoided the Russian campaign. However, his wife and daughter were killed in the allied bombing of Salzburg. After the war, he photographed the redevelopment of Salzburg.

Krieger was little-known in German-speaking countries, except in Salzburg, and even less well known in the United States. In June 2011, an American businessman in New York obtained a collection of photos, without the photographer's identity, and tried to identify them. He showed them to David Dunlap, writer of the Lens Blog in the New York Times, who published several of the photos and asked for help in identifying them. Krieger was soon identified as the photographer.

A book, Der Salzburger Pressefotograf Franz Krieger (1914–1993); Bildberichterstattung im Schatten von NS-Propaganda und Krieg (Salzburg Press Photographer Franz Krieger (1914–1993); Photojournalism in the shadow of Nazi propaganda and war) by Peter F. Kramml and Roman Straßl, was published in German.

His photographs were all in black-and-white.
