= 2023 Salzburg state election =

Salzburg 2023 State Elections

- 23 April 2023

All 36 seats in the Landtag of Salzburg 19 seats needed for a majority
- Turnout: 274,521 (70.94%) ▲5.98%
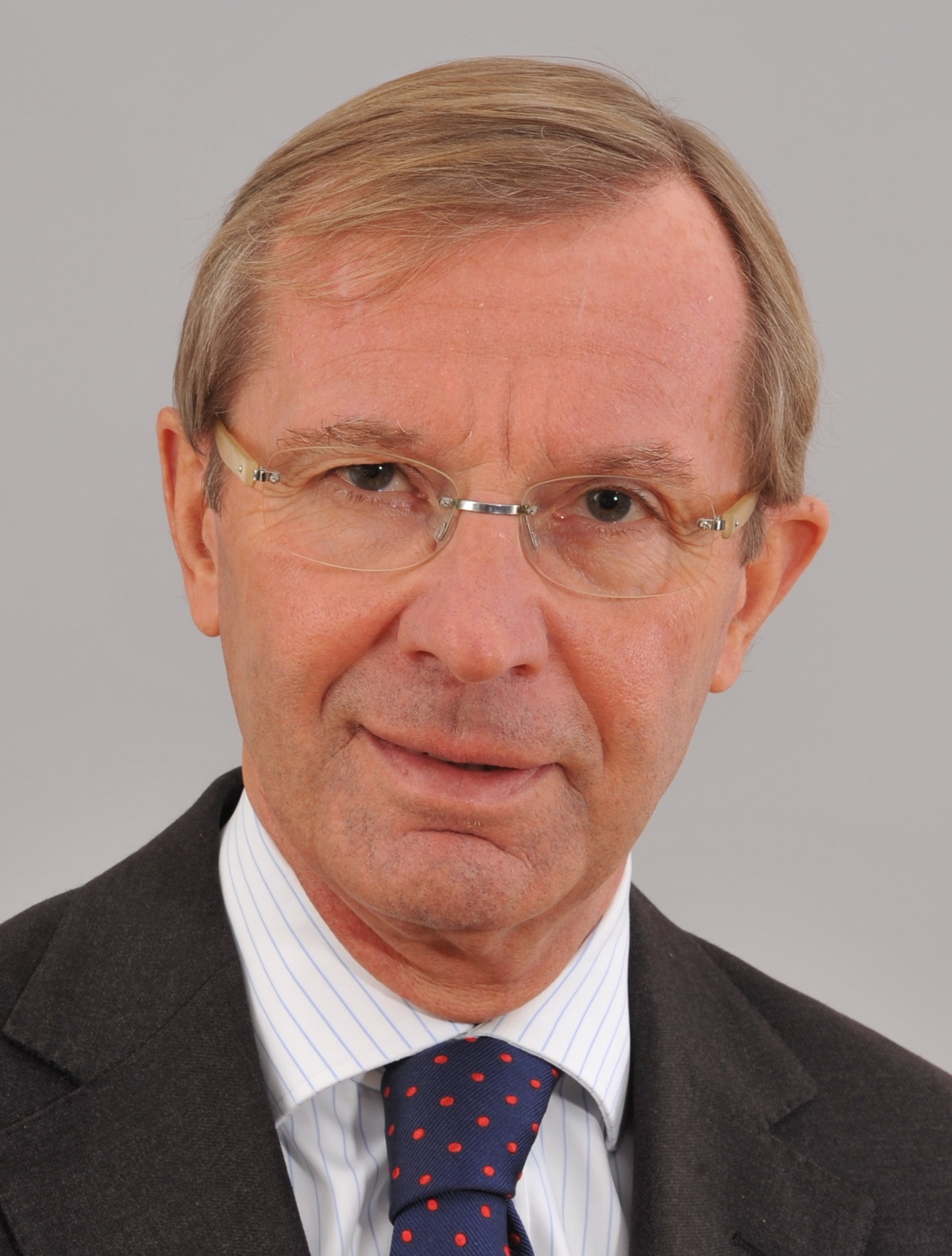

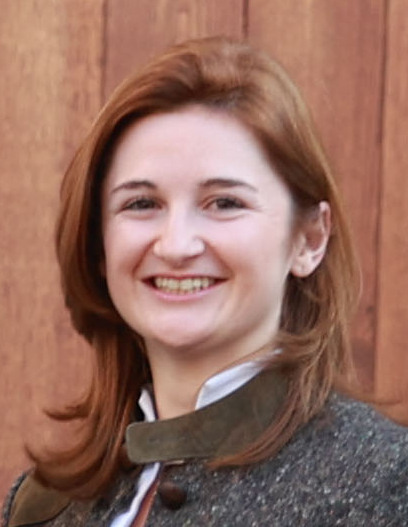

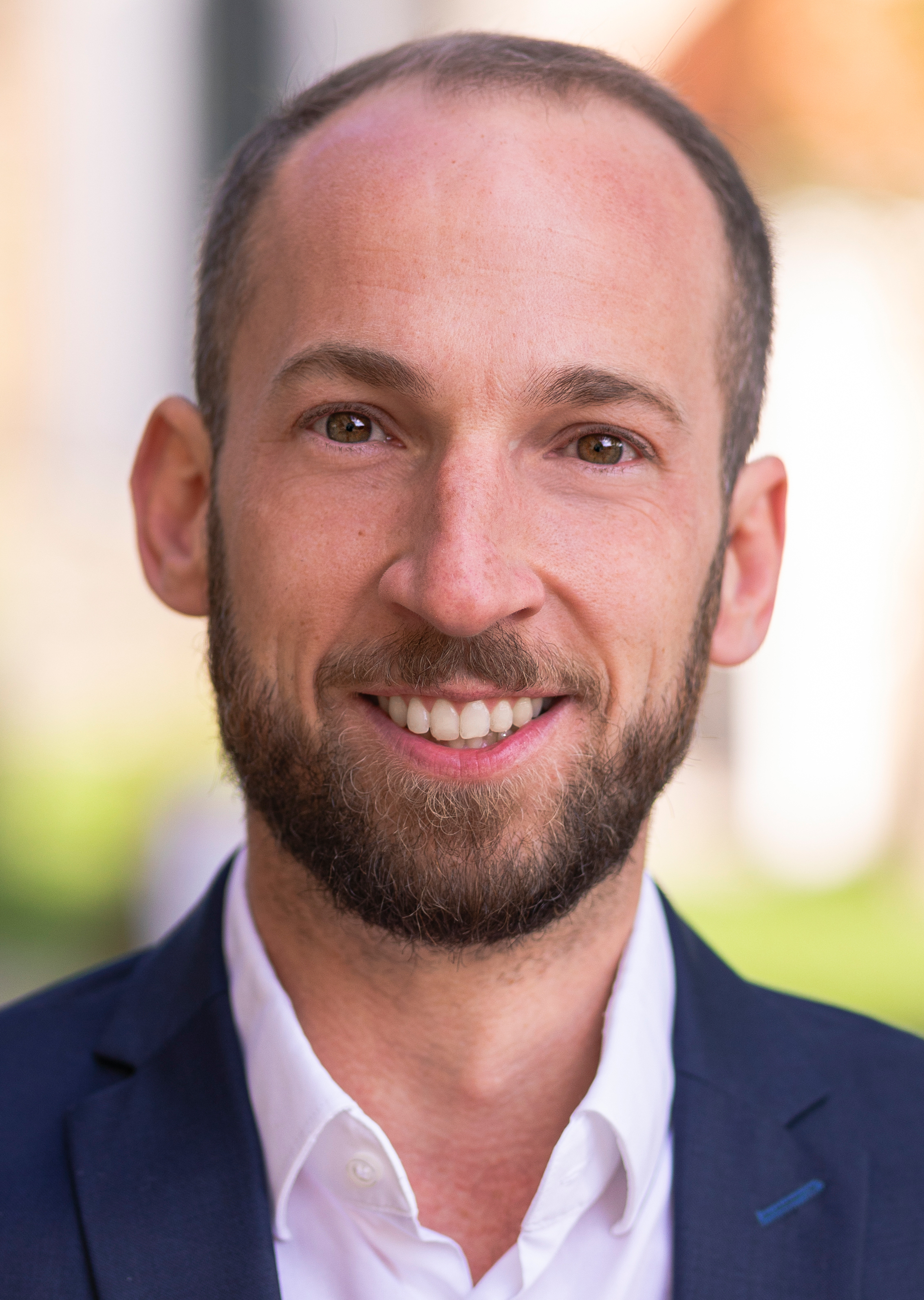

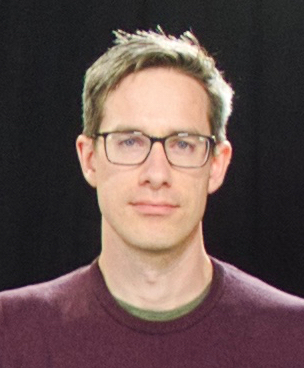

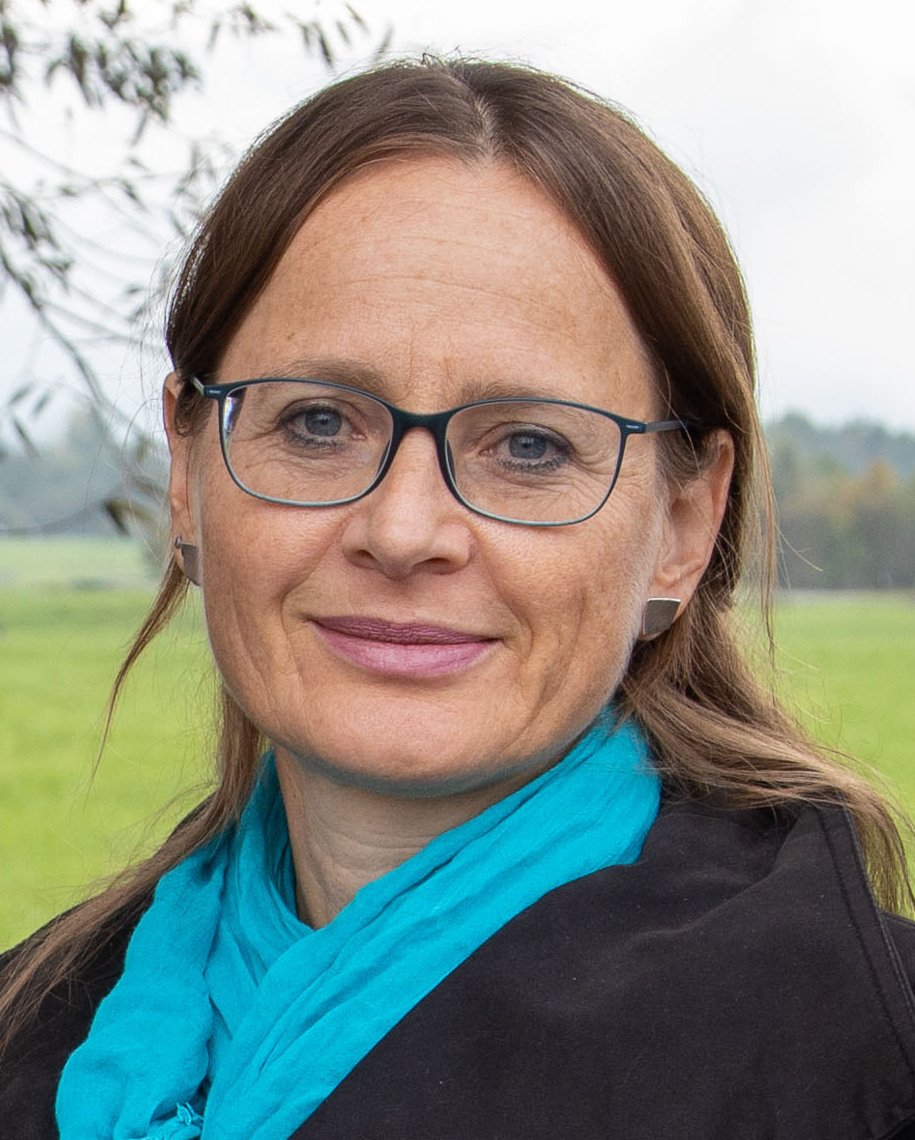

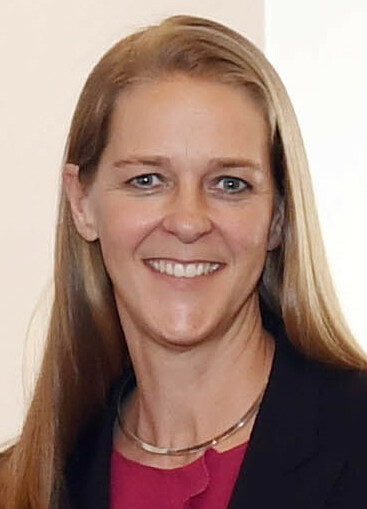
	First party	Second party	Third party
Leader	Wilfried Haslauer	Marlene Svazek	David Egger-Kranzinger
Party	ÖVP	FPÖ	SPÖ
Last election	15 seats, 37.8%	7 seats, 18.8%	8 seats, 20.0%
Seats won	12	10	7
Seat change	▼3	▲3	▼1
Popular vote	81,752	69,310	48,099
Percentage	30.4%	25.7%	17.9%
Swing	▼7.4%	▲6.9%	▼2.1%
	Fourth party	Fifth party	Sixth party
Leader	Kay-Michael Dankl	Martina Berthold	Andrea Klambauer
Party	KPÖ	Greens	NEOS
Last election	0 seats, 0.4%	3 seats, 9.3%	3 seats, 7.3%
Seats won	4	3	0
Seat change	▲4	0	▼3
Popular vote	31,383	22,074	11,310
Percentage	11.7%	8.2%	4.2%
Swing	▲11.3%	▼1.1%	▼3.1%
- Results by town/city (light shade: relative majority, dark shade: absolute majority)
Governor before election
Wilfried Haslauer
ÖVP
Elected Governor
Wilfried Haslauer
ÖVP

The 2023 Salzburg state election took place in the Austrian state of Salzburg on 23 April 2023. Incumbent Governor of Salzburg, Wilfried Haslauer of the Austrian People's Party, ran for re-election. Following the election, a coalition between ÖVP and FPÖ was agreed on, the first of its kind in Salzburg. It was elected by the newly convened Landtag and sworn into office on 14 June 2023.

== Background ==
In the 2018 Salzburg state election, the ÖVP won with 37.8% of the vote, followed by the SPÖ with 20.0%. The FPÖ received 18.8% of the vote, the Greens received 9.3%, and NEOS received 7.3%.

The ÖVP won 15 of the 36 seats in the Landtag (+4), the SPÖ 8 seats (-1), the FPÖ 7 seats (+1), the Greens 3 seats (-4) and NEOS also 3 seats (+3). The Team Stronach, which received 3 seats in the 2013 Salzburg state election, didn't run again.

Turnout was 65.0%, a record low.

After the election, the ÖVP's previous coalition, with the Greens and NEOS, failed to regain a majority due to NEOS falling out of parliament. Thus, a coalition was formed with the FPÖ.

== Electoral system ==
The 36 seats of the Landtag of Salzburg are elected via open list proportional representation in a two-step process. The seats are distributed through a quota system between the six multi-member constituencies, representing the six administrative districts of the state: Stadt Salzburg (City of Salzburg), Salzburg-Umgebung (Flachgau), Hallein (Tennengau), Sankt Johann (Pongau), Tamsweg (Lungau) and Zell am See (Pinzgau). For parties to receive any representation in the Landtag, they must either win at least one seat in a constituency directly, or clear a 5 percent state-wide electoral threshold. Seats are distributed in constituencies according to the Hare quota, with any remaining seats allocated using the D'Hondt method at the state level, to ensure overall proportionality between a party's vote share and its share of seats.

== Eligibility ==
Austrian citizens who are at least 16 or older on election day and who have their main residence in Salzburg on election day are eligible to vote. Eligible voters must be 18 or older to run as candidates in the election and to get elected.

== Contesting parties ==
The table below lists parties represented in the previous Landtag.

Name		Ideology	Leader	2018 result	
Name		Ideology	Leader	Votes (%)	Seats
ÖVP	Austrian People's Party; Österreichische Volkspartei	Conservatism	Wilfried Haslauer	37.8%	15 / 36
SPÖ	Social Democratic Party of Austria; Sozialdemokratische Partei Österreichs	Social democracy	David Egger-Kranzinger	20.0%	8 / 36
FPÖ	Freedom Party of Austria; Freiheitliche Partei Österreichs	Right-wing populism Euroscepticism	Marlene Svazek	18.8%	7 / 36
GRÜNE	The Greens – The Green Alternative; Die Grünen – Die Grüne Alternative	Green politics	Martina Berthold	9.3%	3 / 36
NEOS	NEOS – The New Austria and Liberal Forum; NEOS – Das Neue Österreich und Liberales Forum	Liberalism	Andrea Klambauer	7.3%	3 / 36

Parties in need of signatures + who are not represented in the Landtag

Parties not represented in the Landtag of Salzburg had until 1 March 2023 (1pm) to submit the necessary paperwork and either the signatures of 3 members of the Landtag of Salzburg, or 600 valid signatures of eligible voters in Salzburg, to appear on the ballot statewide.

The number of necessary signatures varied between 80 and 120, depending on the size of the 6 districts in terms of voting-eligible population. It was therefore possible for new parties to contest the election in individual districts only as well, rather than statewide.

NEOS, which won 3 seats in the Landtag in the 2018 election, also needed to collect 600 signatures - because one of their members switched to the ÖVP during the term, leaving them only with 2 seats. NEOS announced they won't ask other factions to support their candidacy, collecting the 600 signatures instead. The party received more than the 600 necessary signatures and will be on the ballot statewide.

The following parties also managed to collect enough signatures by the deadline and will be on the ballot statewide:

- Communist Party of Austria - (KPÖ)
- MFG Austria – People Freedom Fundamental Rights - (MFG)
- Wir sind Salzburg (We are Salzburg) - (WIRS) - (Note: the party was created by former members of the MFG)

The final announcement of qualified parties was released by the state election commission on 13 March 2023, after verification of the submitted signatures and election documents.

Parties that retracted their candidacy

- Salzburg Beer Party - (SBP) - (Note: initially intended to be only on the ballot in the district of Flachgau; the SBP is not associated with the Austrian Beer Party (BIER). On 9 March 2023, it was announced that the SBP was just an art project. The party retracted their candidacy and subsequently won't be approved by the state election commission, therefore won't participate in the election.)

== Campaign ==
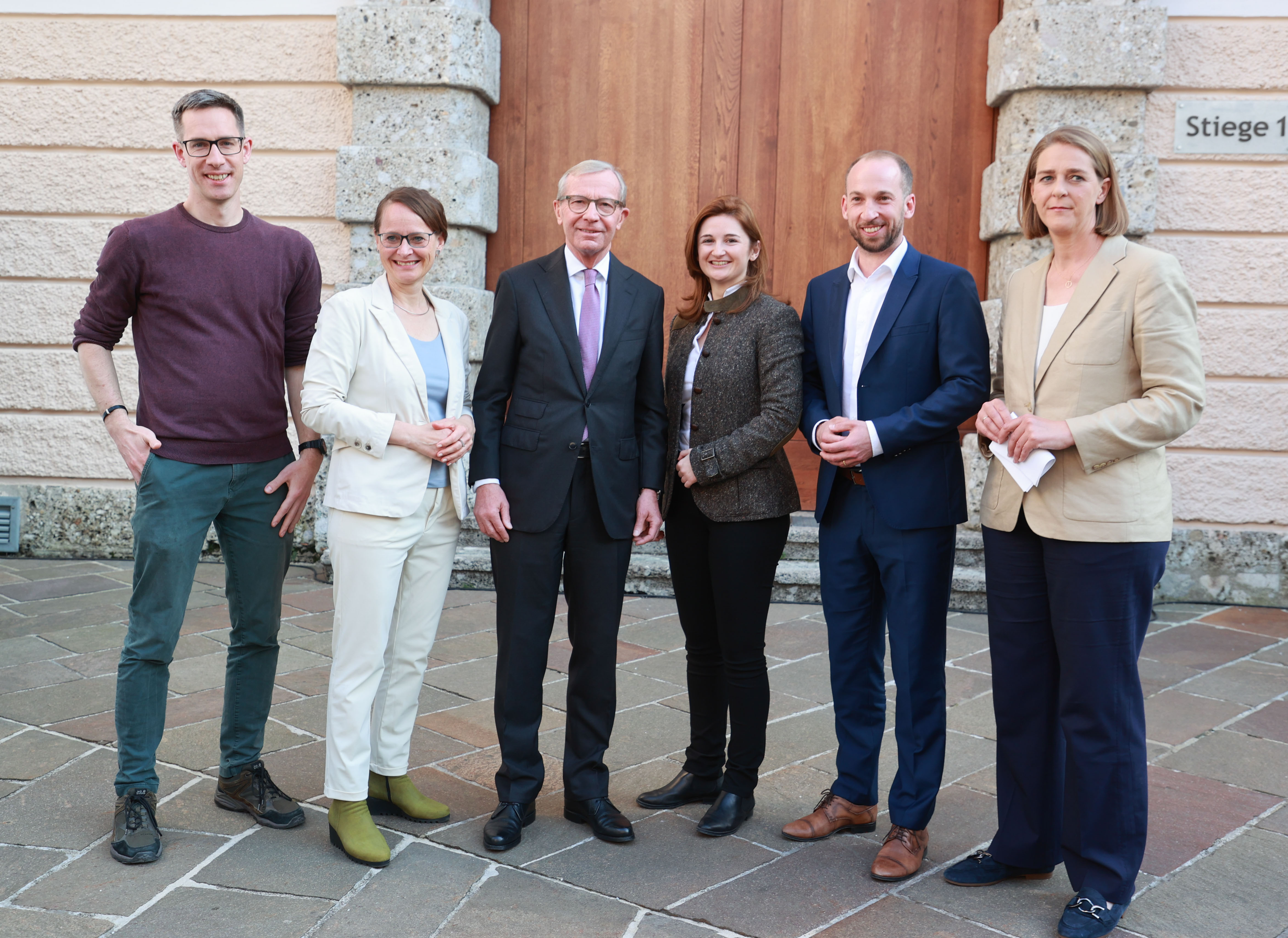
The lead candidates on election day.

Both the Greens and NEOS officially started their election campaigns on 24 February 2023. Both ruled out a coalition with the FPÖ after the election, with the Greens even warning of a FPÖ participation in the next government on their campaign posters. Both the Greens and NEOS remain open about entering another government with each other and with the ÖVP, but said the ÖVP must "change" and become "more open" towards Green policies such as combating climate change or the fight against corruption, which was also emphasized by NEOS. Each party plans to spend €500,000 on its campaign. The bigger parties ÖVP, SPÖ and FPÖ planned to start their campaigns in March.

== Opinion polling ==
Polling firm	Fieldwork date	Sample size	ÖVP	SPÖ	FPÖ	Grüne	NEOS	KPÖ	MFG	Others	Lead
2023 state election	24 Apr 2023	–	30.4	17.9	25.7	8.2	4.2	11.7	0.8	1.2	4.7
Market-Lazarsfeld/ÖSTERREICH	6–11 Apr 2023	800	31	21	28	7	6	5	–	2	3
Market-Lazarsfeld/ÖSTERREICH	23–28 Mar 2023	800	29	21	29	7	7	5	–	2	Tie
GMK/Bezirksblätter Salzburg	15–22 Mar 2023	500	35	21	21	9	5	6	0.5	2 (Note: WIRS: 2%)	14
Peter Hajek/Salzburger Nachrichten	18 Mar 2023 (Note: Date of publication of poll.)	800	33	17	25	9	7	6	1	2 (Note: WIRS: 2%)	8
GMK/Bezirksblätter Salzburg	20 Dec 2022	800	35	22	20	9	8	4	1	1	13
IFDD/Puls24	7–21 Nov 2022	800	31	25	21	9	8	1	2	3	6
Market-Lazarsfeld/ÖSTERREICH	25 Aug 2022	397	22	24	24	8	8	–	5	9	Tie
Peter Hajek/Salzburger Nachrichten	7 May 2022	800	34	24	15	12	8	–	6	1	10
GMK/Bezirksblätter Salzburg	9–15 Nov 2021	800	44	18	13	11	6	2	6	–	26
GMK/Bezirksblätter Salzburg	Dec 2020	400	45	15	16	13	8	–	–	3	29
GMK/Bezirksblätter Salzburg	Dec 2019	400	45	13	15	16	8	–	–	3	29
GMK/Bezirksblätter Salzburg	26 Dec 2018	–	41	21	19	8	8	–	–	3	20
2018 state election	22 Apr 2018	–	37.8	20.0	18.8	9.3	7.3	0.4	–	6.4	17.8

== Results ==
The ÖVP retained its status as the largest party in the legislature, a position it has held for most of the state's history, although it lost three seats and obtained its second-lowest vote and seat share in the state's history, only surpassing the 29% and 11 seats it received in 2013. The FPÖ gained three additional seats and received its best vote and seat share in the state since its foundation, while the SPÖ lost one seat and obtained its worst vote and seat share in the state since its foundation. The KPÖ saw a surge in its vote share from 0.4% in the prior election to over 11% (its best ever result in the state), picking up four seats and achieving representation in the state parliament for the first time since the 1945 elections, while NEOS lost all its seats after failing to reach the 5% electoral threshold. The Greens maintained their three seats.

The incumbent ÖVP-Green-NEOS coalition was defeated due to NEOS' exit from the parliament, as well as the fact the two remaining parties no longer have enough seats to continue a parliamentary majority, meaning a new coalition will need to be negotiated.

Party	Votes	%	Seats	+/–
Austrian People's Party	81,752	30.37	12	–3
Freedom Party of Austria	69,310	25.75	10	+3
Social Democratic Party of Austria	48,099	17.87	7	–1
KPÖ Plus	31,383	11.66	4	+4
The Greens – The Green Alternative	22,074	8.20	3	0
NEOS – The New Austria and Liberal Forum	11,310	4.20	0	–3
We are Salzburg	3,191	1.19	0	New
MFG Austria – People Freedom Fundamental Rights	2,071	0.77	0	New
Total	269,190	100.00	36	0
Valid votes	269,190	98.06		
Invalid/blank votes	5,331	1.94		
Total votes	274,521	100.00		
Registered voters/turnout	386,972	70.94		
Source: Salzburg State Government

== Aftermath ==
Based on the results of the election, 3 reasonable coalitions are possible: ÖVP-FPÖ, ÖVP-SPÖ or ÖVP-SPÖ-Greens.

KPÖ Plus already said during their election campaign that they will become an opposition party, doing checks-and-balances work primarily directed at Governor Haslauer and his ÖVP and pushing housing-related topics. The party re-iterated going into opposition during election night.

The ÖVP announced it would start exploration talks with the FPÖ first on 25 April 2023, followed by the SPÖ and Greens. Finally, the ÖVP would also hold procedural talks with the KPÖ Plus, even though both parties already ruled out a coalition together beforehand out of ideological reasons.

A coalition between ÖVP and FPÖ is seen very sceptically by Governor Haslauer, who warned of a strong FPÖ result before the election. While most FPÖ voters prefer a government role for themselves (95%) and together with the ÖVP (41%), the FPÖ ranked only 4th among ÖVP voters as a preferred partner in a future coalition behind the SPÖ (46%), the Greens (33%), and NEOS (26%). Only 18% of ÖVP voters want to see the FPÖ in the next state government, according to an election survey of voters by SORA for the public broadcaster ORF.

On 25 April 2023, NEOS leader Andrea Klambauer and the whole leadership team of NEOS Salzburg announced their resignation, following their election loss and ejection from the Landtag and state government.

On 28 April 2023, after the conclusion of the first exploration talks with all parties, Governor Haslauer and the ÖVP proposed the creation of a broad ÖVP-FPÖ-SPÖ coalition to represent as many voters as possible. The SPÖ immediately refused the offer, calling it "a political game intended to conceal an outright ÖVP-FPÖ coalition, by taking the SPÖ onboard." The ÖVP has given the SPÖ until 2 May 2023 to re-consider, but the SPÖ immediately said they won't need additional time and once again rejected their offer. They further said that the SPÖ is only willing to enter a coalition with the ÖVP, or in combination with the Greens.

On 2 May 2023, Governor Haslauer announced that the ÖVP leadership committee unanimously voted to start in-depth coalition talks with the FPÖ (after repeatedly opposing a coalition with the FPÖ before the state election). Haslauer said that "the mood in the state and among voters is let's give the FPÖ a chance to govern, so they can show what they can do" and that a coalition with the SPÖ "is impossible right now in their current unstable state". If the talks with the FPÖ are successful, the ÖVP will get 4 government posts, and the FPÖ 3. It would be the third formal ÖVP-FPÖ coalition after Upper Austria and Lower Austria. The announcement of in-depth coalition talks between ÖVP and FPÖ led to sharp criticism from the other parties.

On 24 May 2023, it was announced that ÖVP and FPÖ successfully concluded their coalition negotiations, with both party committees voting on the coalition (contract) on 25 May 2023. Both party committees voted unanimously in favour of the coalition on 25 May 2023. The new ÖVP-FPÖ government, the first in Salzburg history, will be officially presented on Friday, 26 May 2023, together with their new government members and coalition contract for 2023-2028.

On 14 June 2023, the new ÖVP-FPÖ government was elected in the convening new Landtag of Salzburg with the votes of the new government and sworn into office. SPÖ, Greens and KPÖ unanimously voted against the new government.

The following people will be part of the new ÖVP-FPÖ government, including their portfolios:

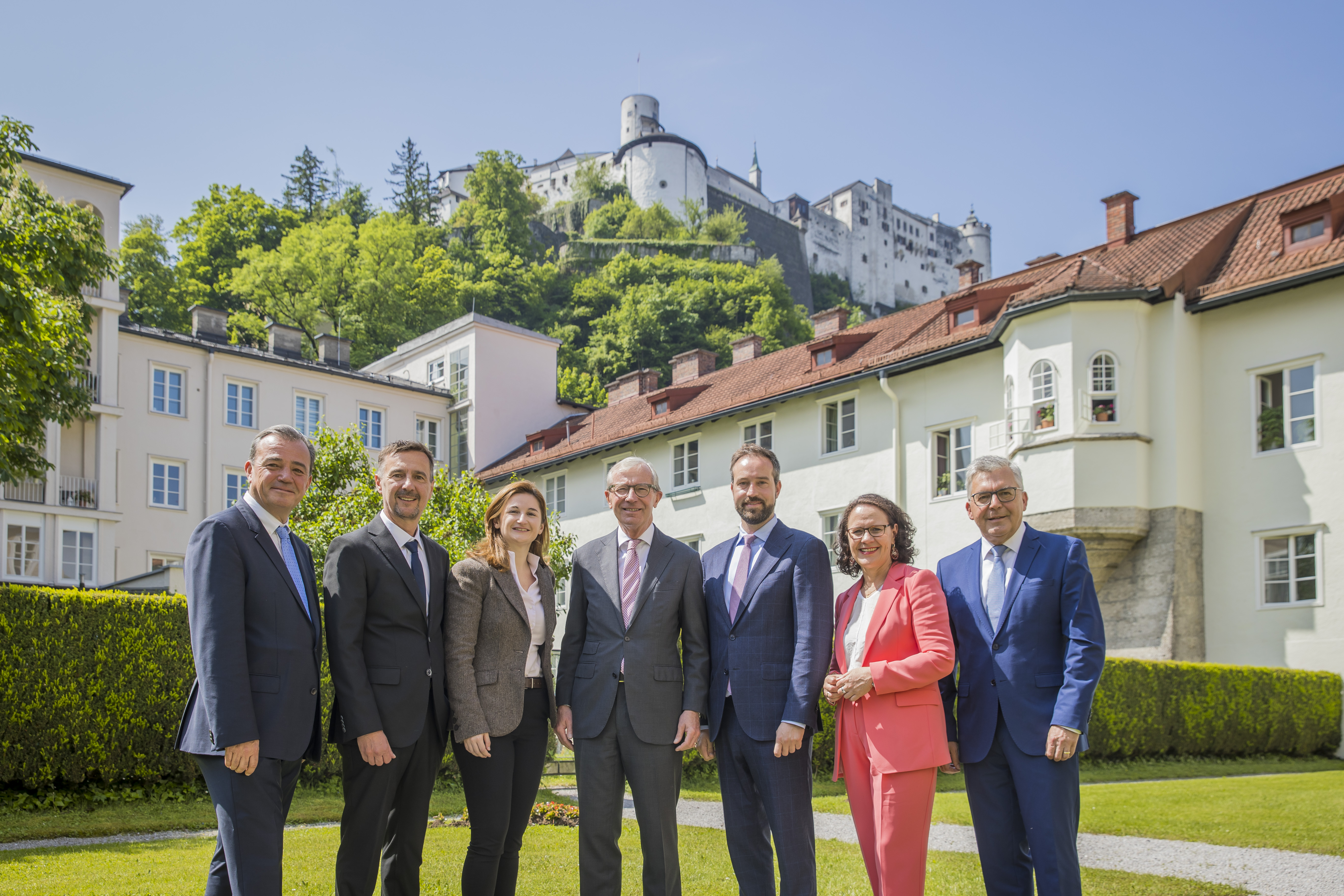
The new ÖVP-FPÖ government members in Salzburg

Governor Wilfried Haslauer (ÖVP):

- State Office Directorate
- Finance and wealth management
- Security and civil protection
- Museums
- Applied research and basic research/science
- Europe

Future Deputy Governor Marlene Svazek (FPÖ):

- Nature and environmental protection, business
- Elementary education and child care
- Hunting and fishing
- Youth, family, integration and generations

Future Deputy Governor Stefan Schnöll (ÖVP):

- Economy, tourism, communities
- Labor market policy, education check and work foundations
- Infrastructure and transport
- Culture

Provincial Councilor Josef Schwaiger (ÖVP):

- Agriculture
- Staff
- Water
- National Park and Antheringer Au
- Energy and Energy Law
- Special organization for asylum and displaced persons quarters

State Councilor Daniela Gutschi (ÖVP):

- Education
- Health
- Women, diversity and equal opportunities

Future Provincial Councilor Mayor Christian Pewny (FPÖ):

- Social topics
- Food control and consumer protection
- Regional development and EU regional policy
- Apprenticeship promotion

Future Provincial Councilor Martin Zauner (FPÖ):

- Spatial planning
- Housing and construction
- Sports
- Ground traffic
