= Cabinet Haslauer jun. I =

The First Haslauer jun. cabinet governed Salzburg from the 2013 Salzburg state election until the 2018 Salzburg state election. The head of the government was Landeshauptmann Wilfried Haslauer, the son of Wilfried Haslauer, who was head of the state from 1977 until 1989. The government's members were voted into power by the Salzburg parliament on June 10, 2013, with 21 votes of Austrian People's Party, Grüne und Team Stronach, against the 15 votes of SPÖ and FPÖ. For the first time since 1945, the SPÖ was not participating in the state government.

On December 14, 2015, state counselor Hans Mayr left Team Stronach, and he continued to be member of the government. Hans Mayr resigned on January 30, 2018. The former president of the state parliament, Brigitta Pallauf (ÖVP), was his successor. Josef Schöchl (ÖVP) succeeded Pallauf as president of the parliament.

| Office | Image | Name | Party | Responsibilities |
|---|---|---|---|---|
| Landeshauptmann | | Wilfried Haslauer | ÖVP | Economy, tourism, labor market, municipalities, education, internal affairs, fire department, security, presidential affairs, Europe |
| 1. Landeshauptmann-Stellvertreterin | | Astrid Rössler | Green | Nature, environment, water, business affairs, spatial planning, building law |
| 2. Landeshauptmann-Stellvertreter | | Christian Stöckl | ÖVP | Finance, state properties and participations, health and hospitals |
| Landesrätin | | Martina Berthold | Green | childcare, adult education, universities, research, science, youth, family, generations, integration, migration, sports, women, equality |
| Landesrätin | | Brigitta Pallauf | ÖVP | traffic, infrastructure, housing; since January 31, 2018, as successor of Hans Mayr |
| Landesrat | | Josef Schwaiger | ÖVP | agriculture, forestry, water management, energy, staff |
| Landesrat | | Heinrich Schellhorn | Green | social affairs, care, culture, folk culture, museums |
Retired members
| Landesrat | | Hans Mayr | SBG | traffic, infrastructure, housing; until January 30, 2018, succeeded by Brigitta Pallauf |
