= Steidl (surname) =

Steidl is a surname. Notable people with the surname include:

- Gabriele Steidl (born 1963), German mathematician
- Gerhard Steidl, founder of the Steidl publishing company
- Pavel Steidl (born 1961), Czech classical guitarist
- Walter Steidl (born 1957), Austrian politician
