= 2004 Salzburg state election =

| ← 1999 | 7 March 2004 | 2009 → |

All 36 seats in the Landtag of Salzburg 19 seats needed for a majority
- Turnout: 282,659 (77.3%) ▲3.2%
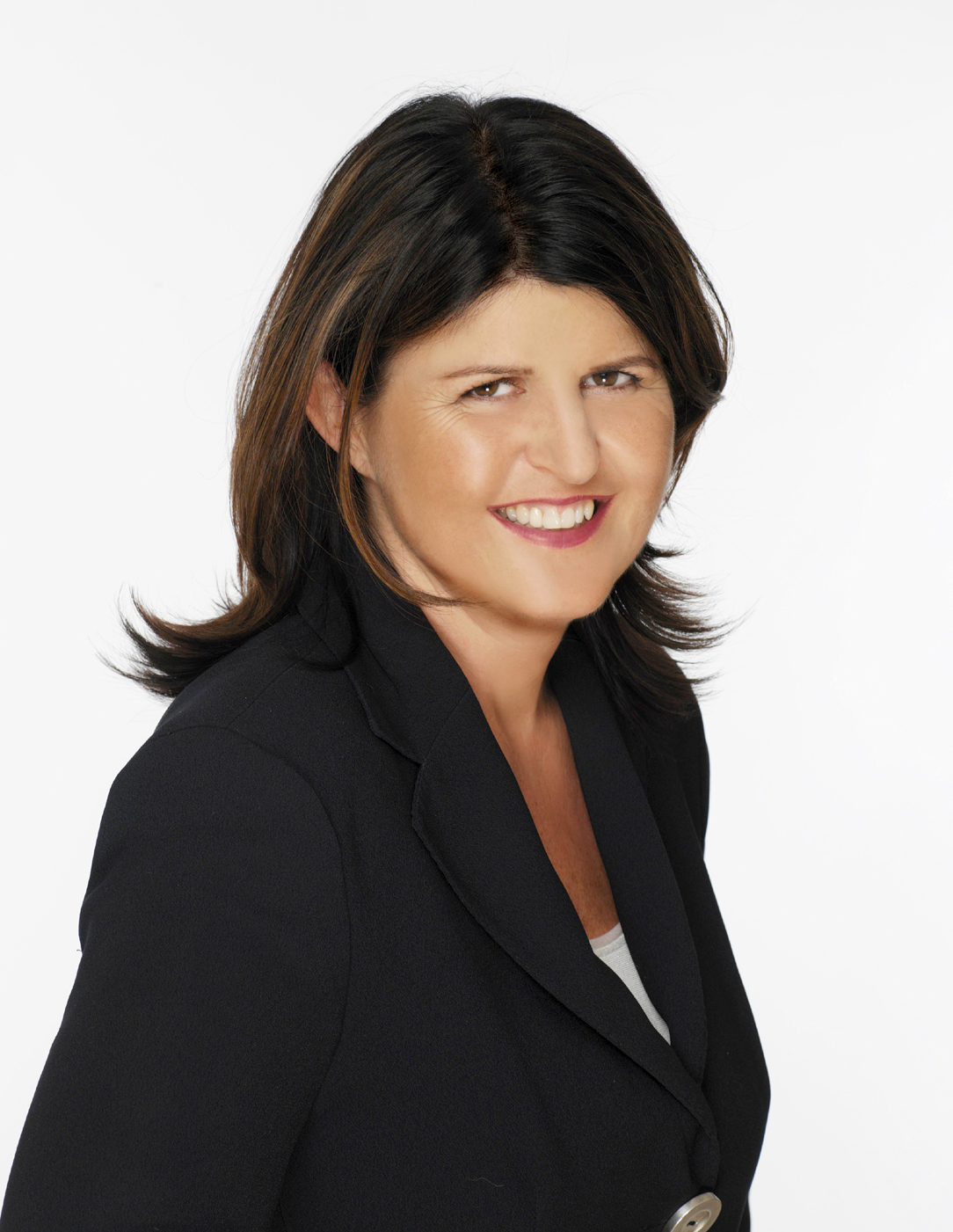

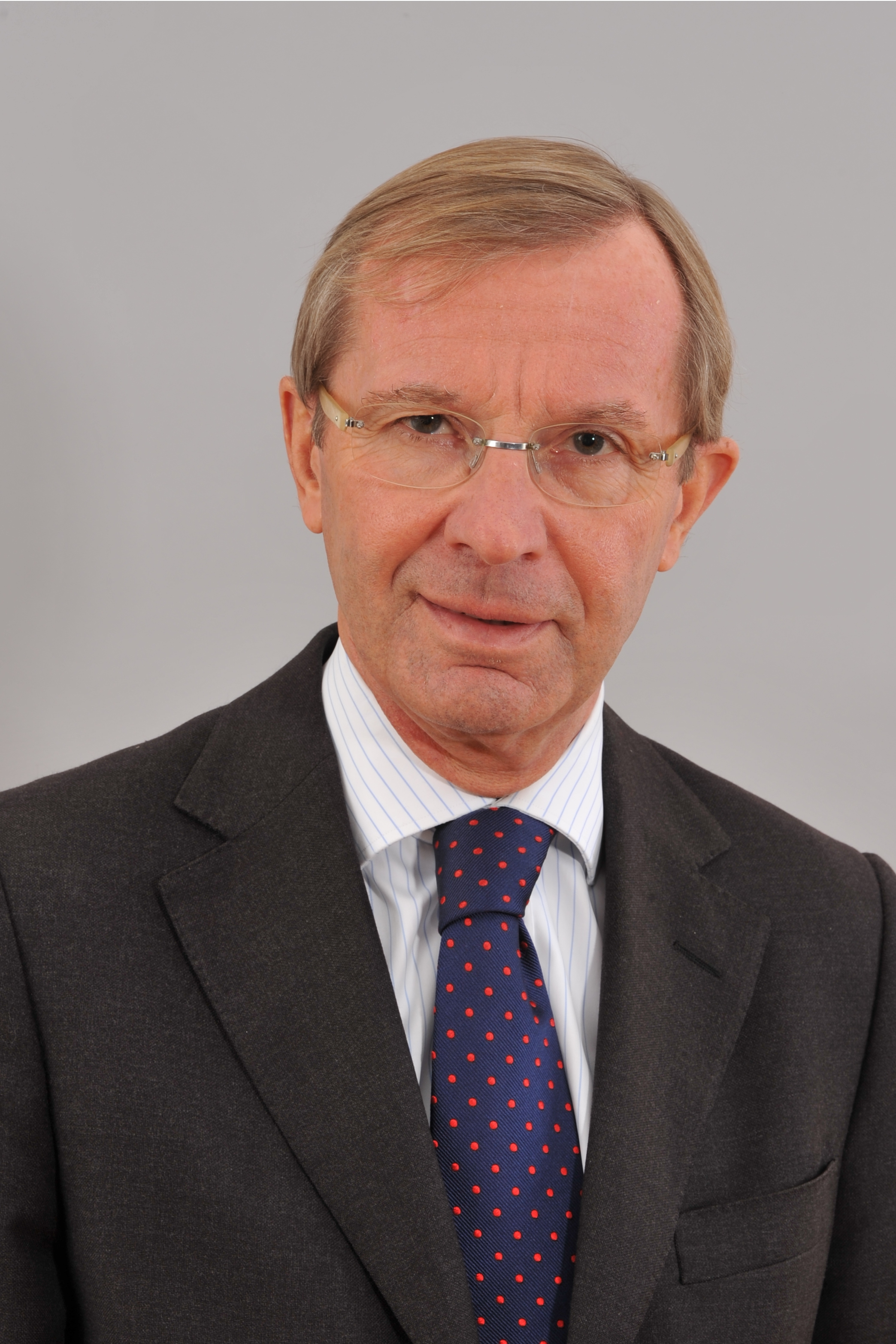

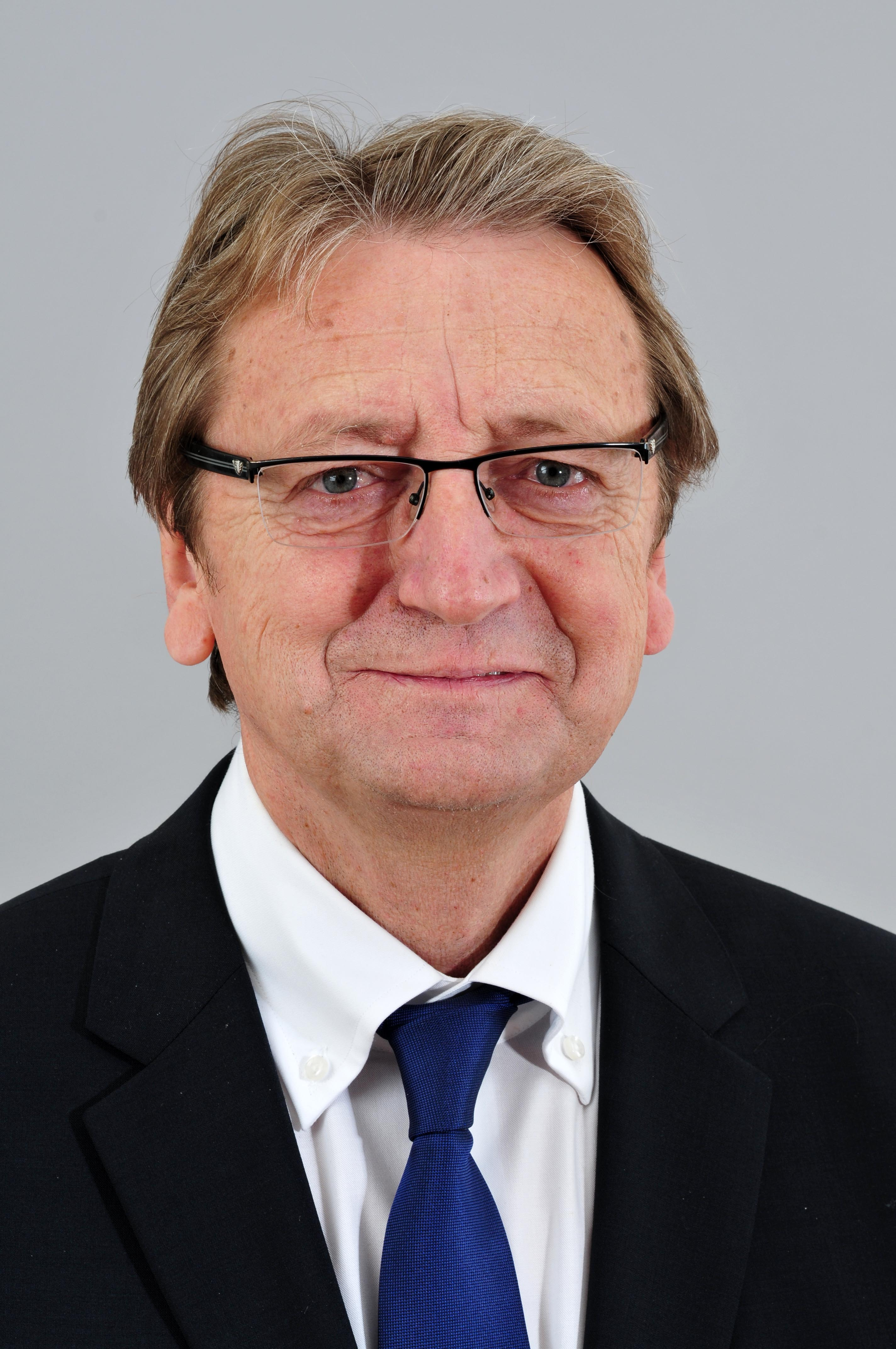

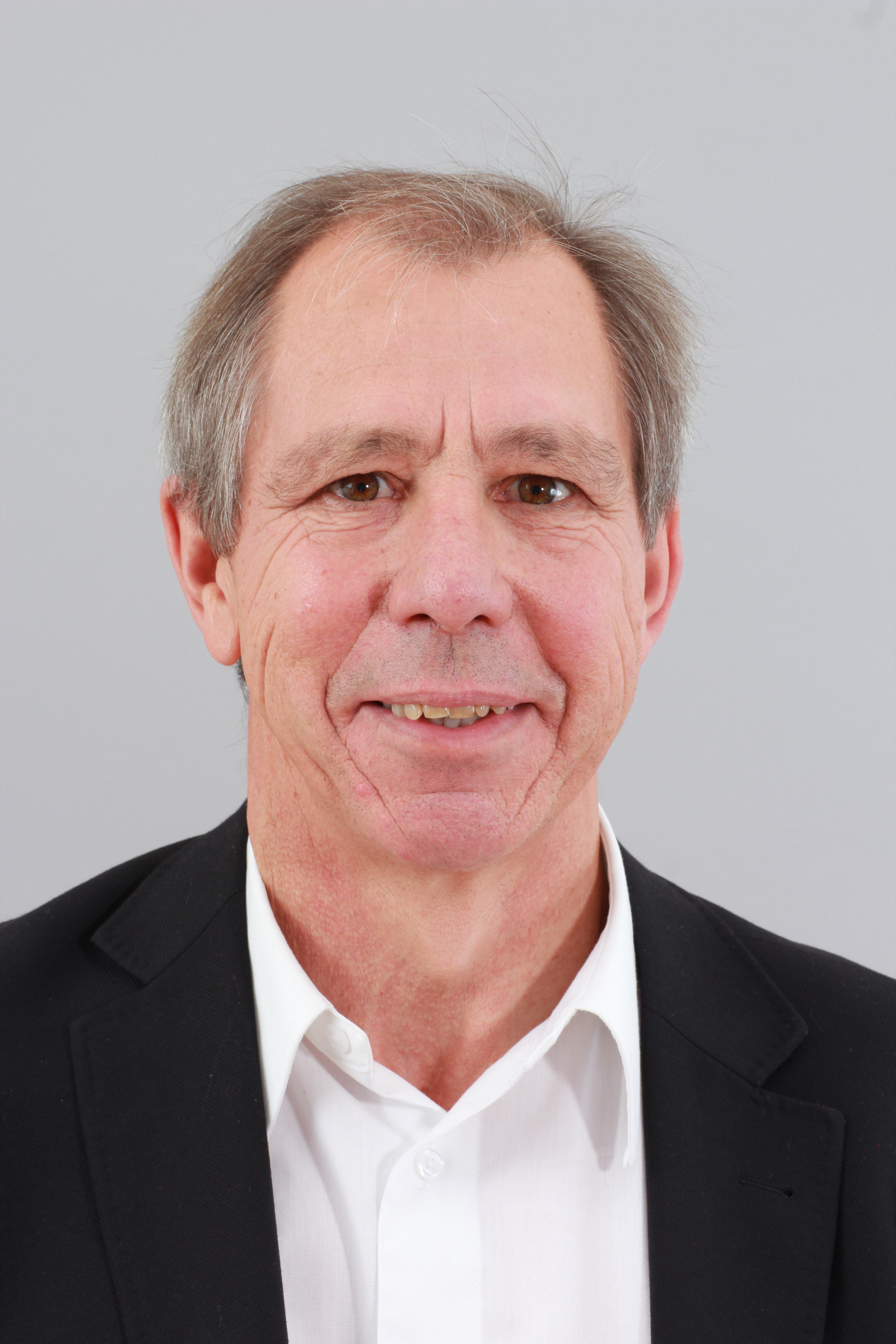
| | First party | Second party |
|---|---|---|
| Leader | Gabi Burgstaller | Wilfried Haslauer Jr. |
| Party | SPÖ | ÖVP |
| Last election | 12 seats, 32.3% | 15 seats, 38.8% |
| Seats won | 17 | 14 |
| Seat change | ▲5 | ▼1 |
| Popular vote | 125,382 | 104,723 |
| Percentage | 45.4% | 37.9% |
| Swing | ▲13.1% | ▼0.8% |
| | Third party | Fourth party |
| Leader | Karl Schnell | Cyriak Schwaighofer |
| Party | FPÖ | Greens |
| Last election | 7 seats, 19.6% | 2 seats, 5.4% |
| Seats won | 3 | 2 |
| Seat change | ▼4 | 0 |
| Popular vote | 24,007 | 22,080 |
| Percentage | 8.7% | 8.0% |
| Swing | ▼10.9% | ▲2.6% |
Governor before election
Franz Schausberger
ÖVP
Elected Governor
Gabi Burgstaller
SPÖ

The 2004 Salzburg state election was held on 7 March 2004 to elect the members of the Landtag of Salzburg.

The result was a historic victory for the Social Democratic Party of Austria (SPÖ), which became the largest party in the state for the first time in history. The SPÖ achieved a decisive swing of over thirteen percentage points, winning 45.4% of votes cast. The Austrian People's Party (ÖVP), which had governed the state uninterrupted since 1945, fell to second place despite only small losses. Incumbent Governor Franz Schausberger did not run for re-election; rather, Wilfried Haslauer Jr. was the ÖVP's top candidate. The Freedom Party of Austria (FPÖ) lost over half its vote share and seats to the SPÖ, while The Greens made minor gains.

A coalition between the SPÖ and Greens was mathematically possible, but dismissed by the SPÖ, who had ruled out such an arrangement prior to the election. They subsequently formed a coalition with the ÖVP. Gabi Burgstaller became the first SPÖ governor of Salzburg. She became the second female state governor in Austrian history (after Waltraud Klasnic in 1996), and the first to enter office as the result of an election victory.

== Background ==
In the 1999 election, the ÖVP remained the largest party, though the SPÖ increased their vote share by five points. The FPÖ stayed level on just under 20% of votes, and the Greens narrowly retained their presence in the Landtag. The ÖVP formed a coalition with the SPÖ.

== Electoral system ==
The 36 seats of the Landtag of Salzburg are elected via open list proportional representation in a two-step process. The seats are distributed between six multi-member constituencies. For parties to receive any representation in the Landtag, they must either win at least one seat in a constituency directly, or clear a 5 percent state-wide electoral threshold. Seats are distributed in constituencies according to the Hare quota, with any remaining seats allocated using the D'Hondt method at the state level, to ensure overall proportionality between a party's vote share and its share of seats.

== Contesting parties ==
The table below lists parties represented in the previous Landtag.

| Name | | Ideology | Leader | 1999 result | |
| Name | | Ideology | Leader | Votes (%) | Seats |
|---|---|---|---|---|---|
| ÖVP | Austrian People's Party; Österreichische Volkspartei | Christian democracy | Wilfried Haslauer Jr. | 38.8% | 15 / 36 |
| SPÖ | Social Democratic Party of Austria; Sozialdemokratische Partei Österreichs | Social democracy | Gabi Burgstaller | 32.3% | 12 / 36 |
| FPÖ | Freedom Party of Austria; Freiheitliche Partei Österreichs | Right-wing populism Euroscepticism | Karl Schnell | 19.6% | 7 / 36 |
| GRÜNE | The Greens – The Green Alternative; Die Grünen – Die Grüne Alternative | Green politics | Cyriak Schwaighofer | 5.4% | 2 / 36 |

== Results ==
| Party | Votes | % | +/− | Seats | +/− |
|---|---|---|---|---|---|
| Social Democratic Party of Austria (SPÖ) | 125,382 | 45.40 | +13.06 | 17 | +5 |
| Austrian People's Party (ÖVP) | 104,723 | 37.92 | –0.83 | 14 | –1 |
| Freedom Party of Austria (FPÖ) | 24,007 | 8.69 | –10.89 | 3 | –4 |
| The Greens – The Green Alternative (GRÜNE) | 22,080 | 7.99 | +2.60 | 2 | ±0 |
| Invalid/blank votes | 6,467 | – | – | – | – |
| Total | 282,659 | 100 | – | 36 | 0 |
| Registered voters/turnout | ? | 77.3 | +3.2 | – | – |
Source: Salzburg State Government

Popular vote
| SPÖ | 45.40% |
| ÖVP | 37.92% |
| FPÖ | 8.69% |
| GRÜNE | 7.99% |

Landtag seats
| SPÖ | 47.22% |
| ÖVP | 38.89% |
| FPÖ | 8.33% |
| GRÜNE | 5.56% |
