= 2018 Salzburg state election =

- 22 April 2018

All 36 seats in the Landtag of Salzburg 19 seats needed for a majority
- Turnout: 253,396 (65.0%) ▼6.0%
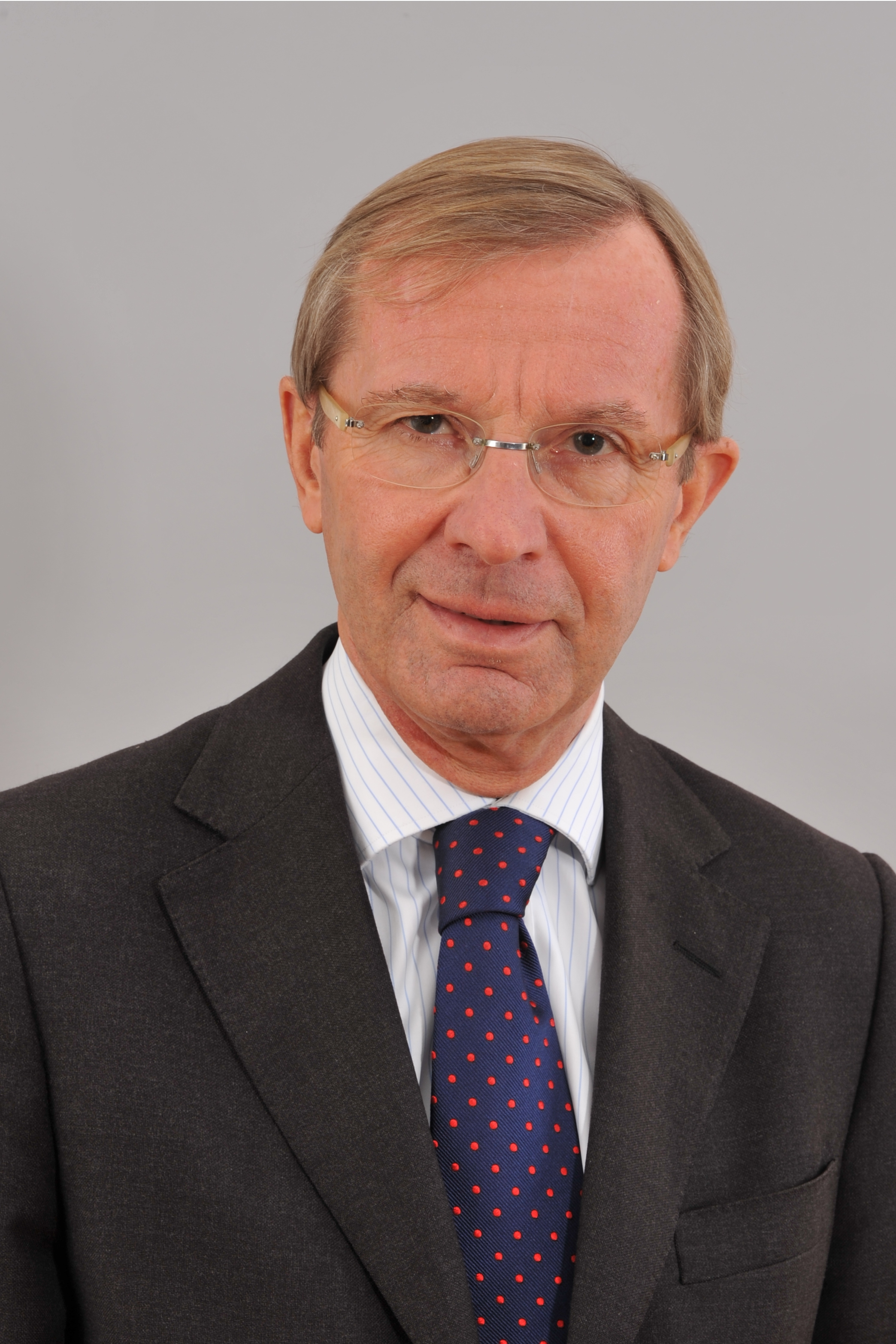

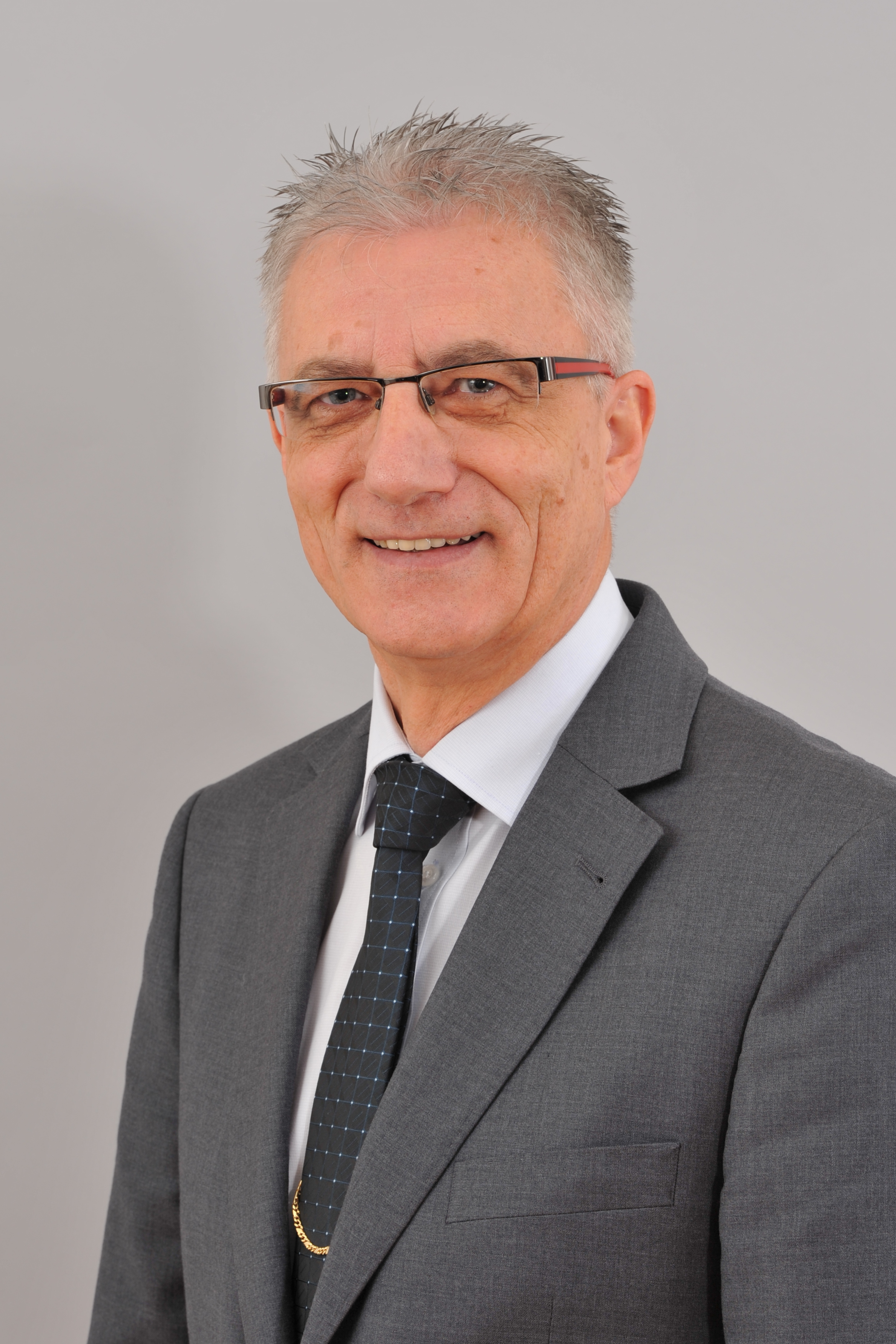

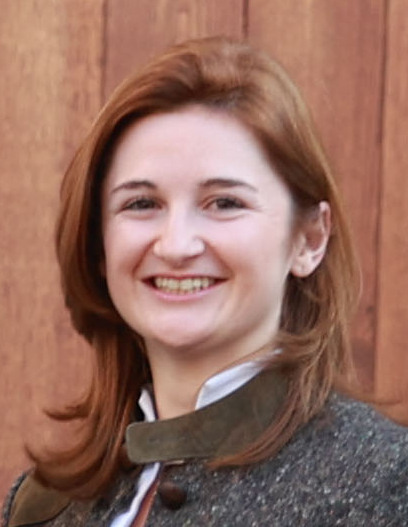

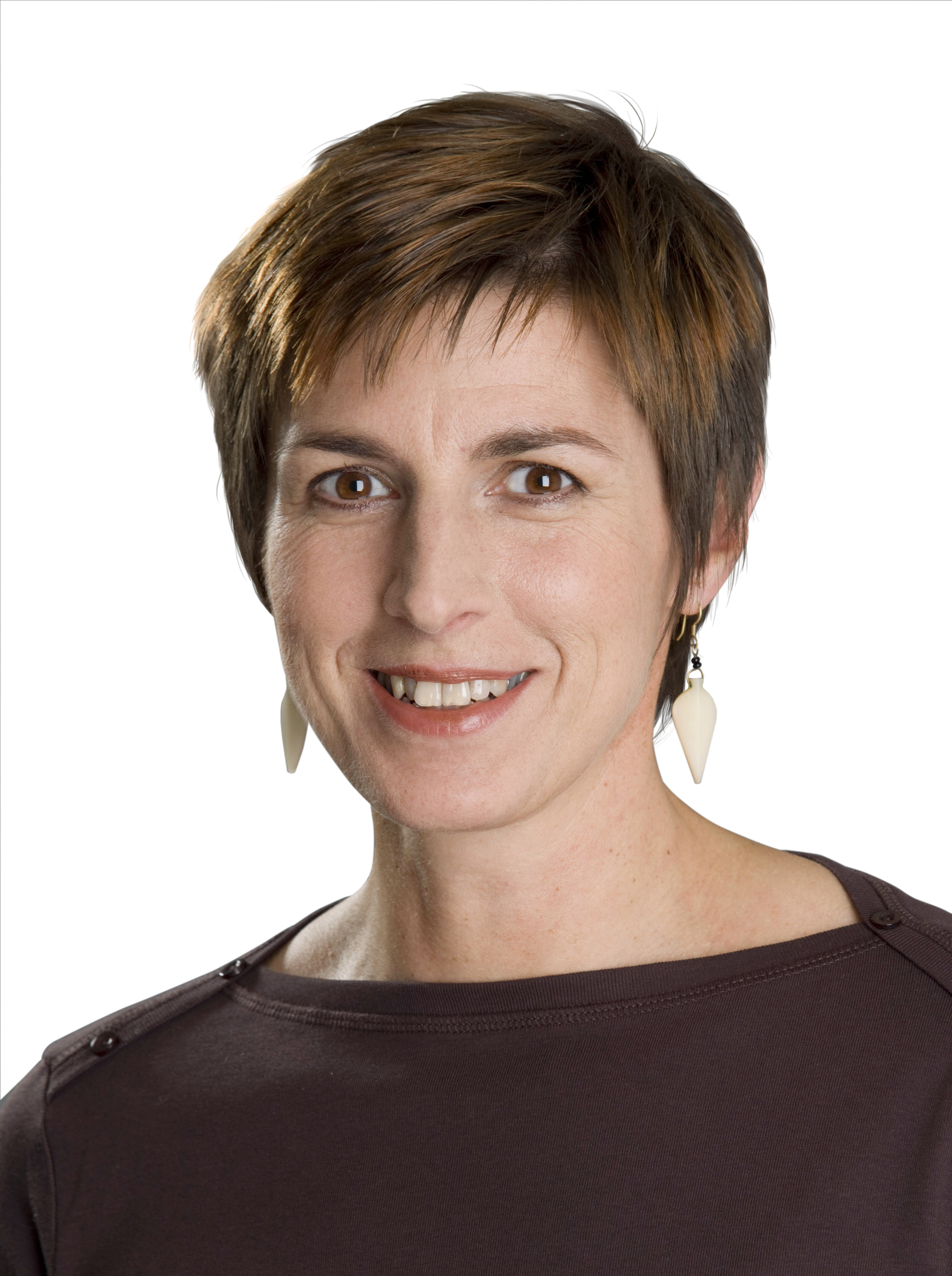

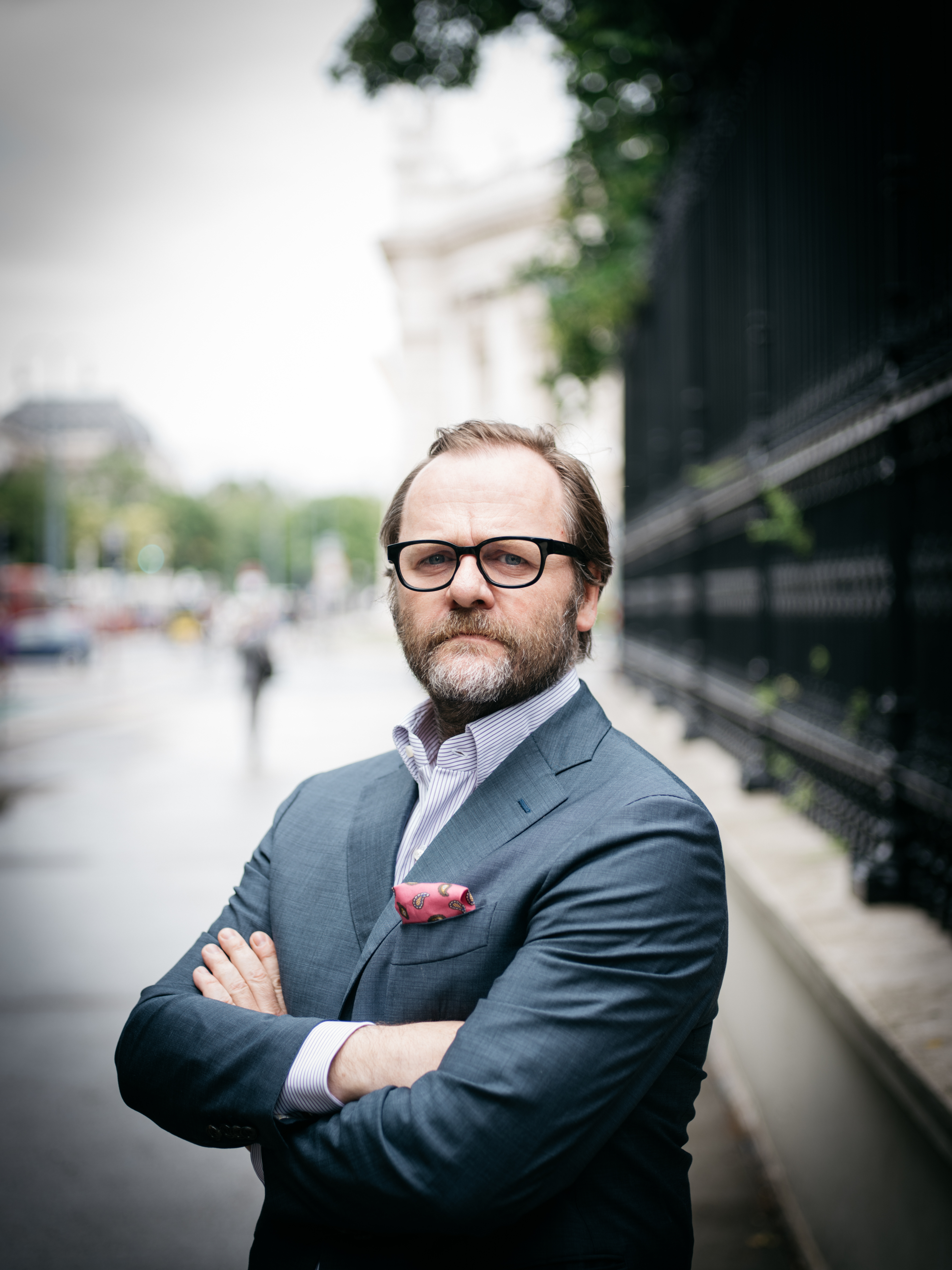
	First party	Second party	Third party
Leader	Wilfried Haslauer Jr.	Walter Steidl	Marlene Svazek
Party	ÖVP	SPÖ	FPÖ
Last election	11 seats, 29.0%	9 seats, 23.8%	6 seats, 17.0%
Seats won	15	8	7
Seat change	▲4	▼1	▲1
Popular vote	94,642	50,175	47,194
Percentage	37.8%	20.0%	18.8%
Swing	▲8.8%	▼3.8%	▲1.8%
	Fourth party	Fifth party
Leader	Astrid Rössler	Sepp Schellhorn
Party	Greens	NEOS
Last election	7 seats, 20.2%	Did not contest
Seats won	3	3
Seat change	▼4	▲3
Popular vote	23,337	18,225
Percentage	9.3%	7.3%
Swing	▼10.9%	▲7.3%
- Results by municipality. The lighter shade indicates a plurality; the darker shade indicates a majority.
Governor before election
Wilfried Haslauer Jr.
ÖVP
Elected Governor
Wilfried Haslauer Jr.
ÖVP

The 2018 Salzburg state election was held on 22 April 2018 to elect the members of the Landtag of Salzburg.

The conservative Austrian People's Party (ÖVP) placed first, taking 37.8% of votes on a swing of almost nine percentage points, a decisive lead over the second-placed Social Democratic Party of Austria (SPÖ) which slipped four points, finishing on just over 20%. The Freedom Party of Austria (FPÖ) made small gains. The Greens were the main loser of the election; their voteshare fell by over half from 2013. NEOS – The New Austria (NEOS) contested their first state election in Salzburg, debuting at 7.3%. Team Stronach, which had won 8.3% in the previous election, did not compete.

The previous government coalition of the ÖVP, Greens, and Team Stronach now lacked a majority due to the absence of Team Stronach. After negotiations, NEOS agreed to join a coalition with the ÖVP and Greens, marking the first time NEOS had participated in a state government in Austria.

== Background ==
After the 2013 election, the SPÖ government was replaced by a coalition of the ÖVP, Greens, and Team Stronach. In November 2015, Hans Mayr, the only member of the state government from Team Stronach, left the party, but continued to serve in government as an independent. In 2016 he founded his own party, the Salzburg Citizens' Community (SBG), with the intention of running in the 2018 state election.

In June 2015, conflicts arose between the federal FPÖ and the party's Salzburg branch, culminating in the expulsion of former regional chairmen Strache Schnell and Rupert Doppler from the party. They subsequently founded the Free Party Salzburg (FPS), which was joined by five of the FPÖ's six Landtag deputies. They sought to run in the 2018 election.

== Electoral system ==
The 36 seats of the Landtag of Salzburg are elected via open list proportional representation in a two-step process. The seats are distributed between six multi-member constituencies. For parties to receive any representation in the Landtag, they must either win at least one seat in a constituency directly, or clear a 5 percent state-wide electoral threshold. Seats are distributed in constituencies according to the Hare quota, with any remaining seats allocated using the D'Hondt method at the state level, to ensure overall proportionality between a party's vote share and its share of seats.

== Contesting parties ==
The table below lists parties represented in the previous Landtag.

Name		Ideology	Leader	2013 result	
Name		Ideology	Leader	Votes (%)	Seats
ÖVP	Austrian People's Party; Österreichische Volkspartei	Christian democracy	Wilfried Haslauer Jr.	29.0%	11 / 36
SPÖ	Social Democratic Party of Austria; Sozialdemokratische Partei Österreichs	Social democracy	Walter Steidl	23.8%	9 / 36
GRÜNE	The Greens – The Green Alternative; Die Grünen – Die Grüne Alternative	Green politics	Astrid Rössler	20.2%	7 / 36
FPÖ	Freedom Party of Austria; Freiheitliche Partei Österreichs	Right-wing populism Euroscepticism	Marlene Svazek	17.0%	6 / 36

Team Stronach, which contested the previous election and won 8.3% of votes and three seats did not contest the 2018 election.

In addition to the parties already represented in the Landtag, five parties collected enough signatures to be placed on the ballot:

- NEOS – The New Austria (NEOS)
- Free Party Salzburg (FPS)
- List Hans Mayr – Salzburg Citizens' Community (MAYR)
- KPÖ Plus (KPÖ) – on the ballot only in Salzburg City and Salzburg Surrounds
- Christian Party of Austria (CPÖ) – on the ballot only in Salzburg Surrounds

== Opinion polling ==
Polling firm	Fieldwork date	Sample size	ÖVP	SPÖ	Grüne	FPÖ	NEOS	FPS	MAYR	Others	Lead
2018 state election	22 Apr 2018	–	37.8	20.0	9.3	18.8	7.3	4.5	1.7	0.5	17.8
IMAS	1–19 Mar 2018	800	32–35	24–26	14–17	16–18	6	–	–	–	6–11
GMK	17 Mar 2018	?	40	21	11	18	6	2	2	0	19
IMAS	February 2018	800	31–33	23–25	14–16	18–20	7–9	–	0.5–1.5	–	6–10
Hajek	25 Feb 2018	802	33–41	18–24	7–11	20–26	5–9	1	1	1	7–21
GMK	December 2017	?	41	18	11	16	5	3	5	1	23
IMAS	4–14 Dec 2017	800	35	21	15	16	9	1	1.5	1.5	14
Jaksch & Partner	20 Nov–14 Dec 2017	808	34	23	10	24	8	1	1	0	10
2013 state election	5 May 2013	–	29.0	23.8	20.2	17.0	–	–	–	10.0 (Note: Including Team Stronach (8.3%), which did not contest the 2018 election.)	5.2

== Results ==
Party	Votes	%	+/−	Seats	+/−
Austrian People's Party (ÖVP)	94,642	37.78	+8.77	15	+4
Social Democratic Party of Austria (SPÖ)	50,175	20.03	–3.80	8	–1
Freedom Party of Austria (FPÖ)	47,194	18.84	+1.81	7	+1
The Greens – The Green Alternative (GRÜNE)	23,337	9.31	–10.87	3	–4
NEOS – The New Austria (NEOS)	18,225	7.27	+7.27	3	+3
Free Party Salzburg (FPS)	11,386	4.54	New	0	New
List Hans Mayr – Salzburg Citizens' Community (MAYR)	4,385	1.75	New	0	New
KPÖ Plus (KPÖ)	1,014	0.40	+0.07	0	±0
Christian Party of Austria (CPÖ)	181	0.07	+0.07	0	±0
Invalid/blank votes	2,857	–	–	–	–
Total	253,396	100	–	36	0
Registered voters/turnout	390,091	64.96	–6.00	–	–
Source: Salzburg State Government

Popular vote
ÖVP	37.78%
SPÖ	20.03%
FPÖ	18.84%
GRÜNE	9.31%
NEOS	7.27%
FPS	4.54%
MAYR	1.75%
Other	0.47%

Landtag seats
ÖVP	41.67%
SPÖ	22.22%
FPÖ	19.44%
GRÜNE	8.33%
NEOS	8.33%

=== Results by constituency ===
Constituency	ÖVP		SPÖ		FPÖ		Grüne		NEOS		FPS		Others	Total seats	Turnout
Constituency	%	S	%	S	%	S	%	S	%	S	%	S	%	Total seats	Turnout
Salzburg City	29.9	2	23.2	2	15.9	1	15.8	1	9.2		3.5		2.4	6	57.3
Hallein	40.1	1	20.4		18.0		9.2		7.1		3.9		1.4	1	68.3
Salzburg Surrounds	39.5	3	16.8	1	20.6	2	9.5		8.2		3.2		2.0	6	67.4
St. Johann im Pongau	39.9	1	21.0	1	20.8	1	5.0		5.5		4.2		3.7	3	68.6
Tamsweg	48.7		17.4		21.1		4.2		4.1		3.4		1.1	0	71.4
Zell am See	38.5	2	21.1	1	17.7	1	5.7		5.5		9.6		1.8	4	65.1
Remaining seats		6		3		2		2		3		0		16	
Total	37.8	15	20.0	8	18.8	7	9.3	3	7.3	3	4.5	0	2.2	36	65.0
Source: Salzburg State Government

=== Maps ===
Results by party

== Aftermath ==
On 23 April, Astrid Rössler announced her resignation as Greens leader, but remained in office on an interim basis and to participate in coalitions negotiations.

The ÖVP initiated exploratory talks with all parties in the Landtag. On 2 May, the state ÖVP executive voted to begin negotiate with the Greens and NEOS for a governing coalition. Haslauer described this arrangement as "a political alliance of the centre"; however, ÖVP federal Chancellor Sebastian Kurz advocated a coalition with the FPÖ. On 25 May, coalition negotiations between the three parties were finalised, and the cabinet was presented. It was dubbed the "Dirndl coalition", after a traditional dress which is coloured similarly to the parties involved (black, green, and pink). The government was sworn in on 13 June.
