= Gerlind =

Gerlind is a German female given name. Notable people with the name include:

- Gerlind Ahnert, actress in 1967 East German film Meine Freundin Sybille
- Gerlind Beyrichen, German sprinter, bronze medalist in Athletics at the 1967 Summer Universiade
- Gerlind Cornell Borchers (1925–2014), German actress
- Gerlind Plonka, German mathematician
- Gerlind Reinshagen (born 1926), German writer
- Gerlind Scheller (born 1967), German synchronized swimmer
