= 2013 Salzburg state election =

- 5 May 2013

All 36 seats in the Landtag of Salzburg 19 seats needed for a majority
- Turnout: 276,597 (71.0%) ▼3.4%
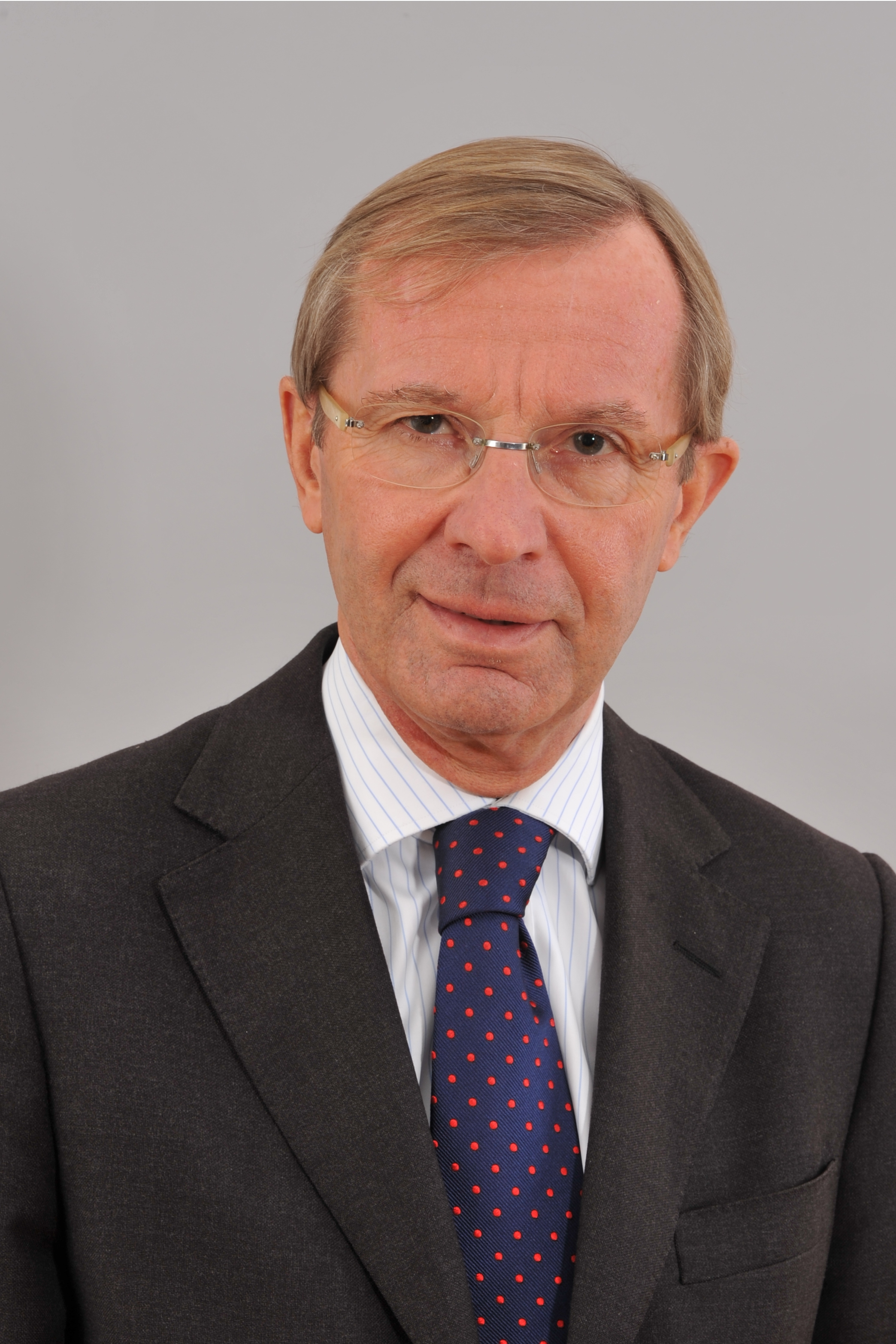

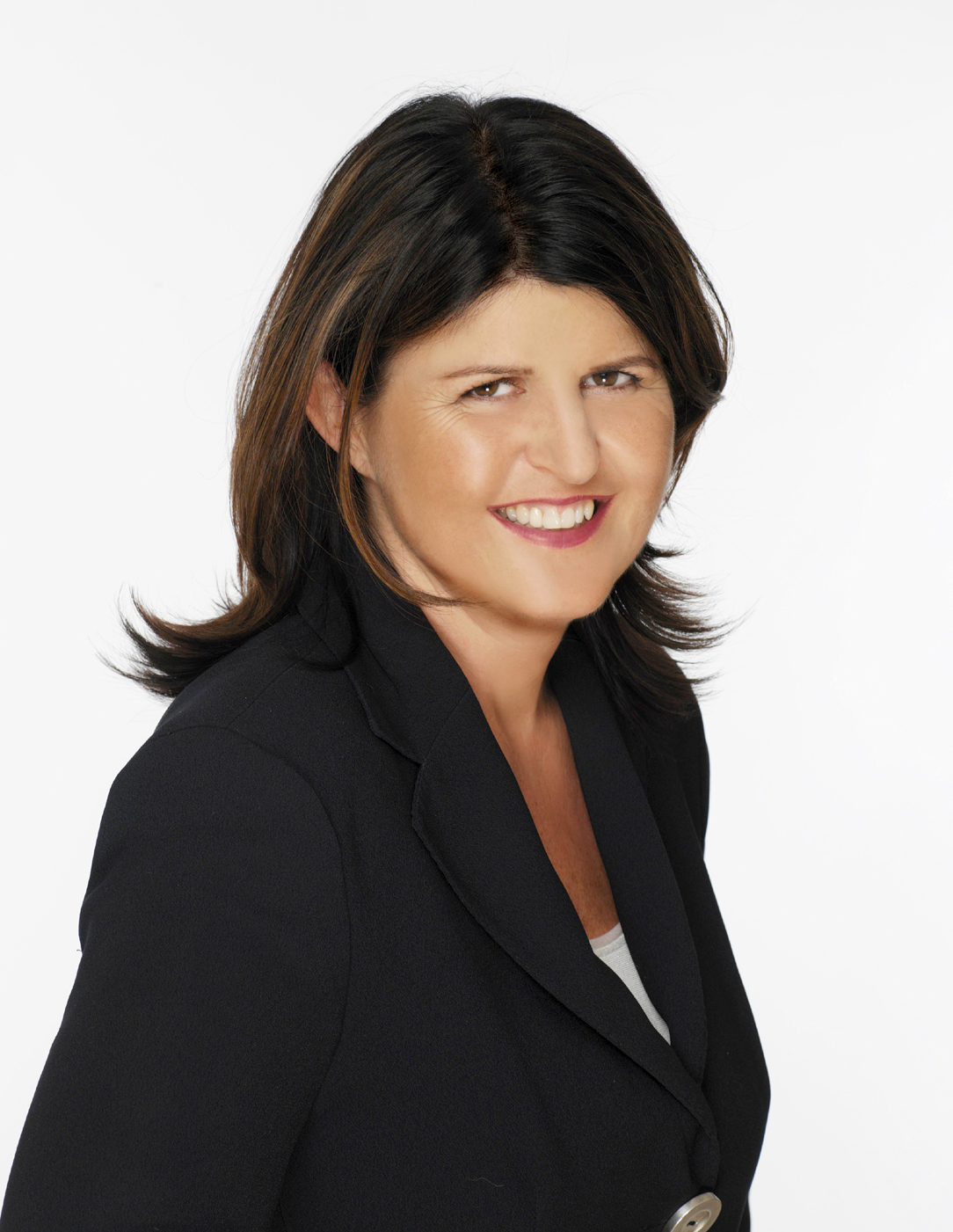

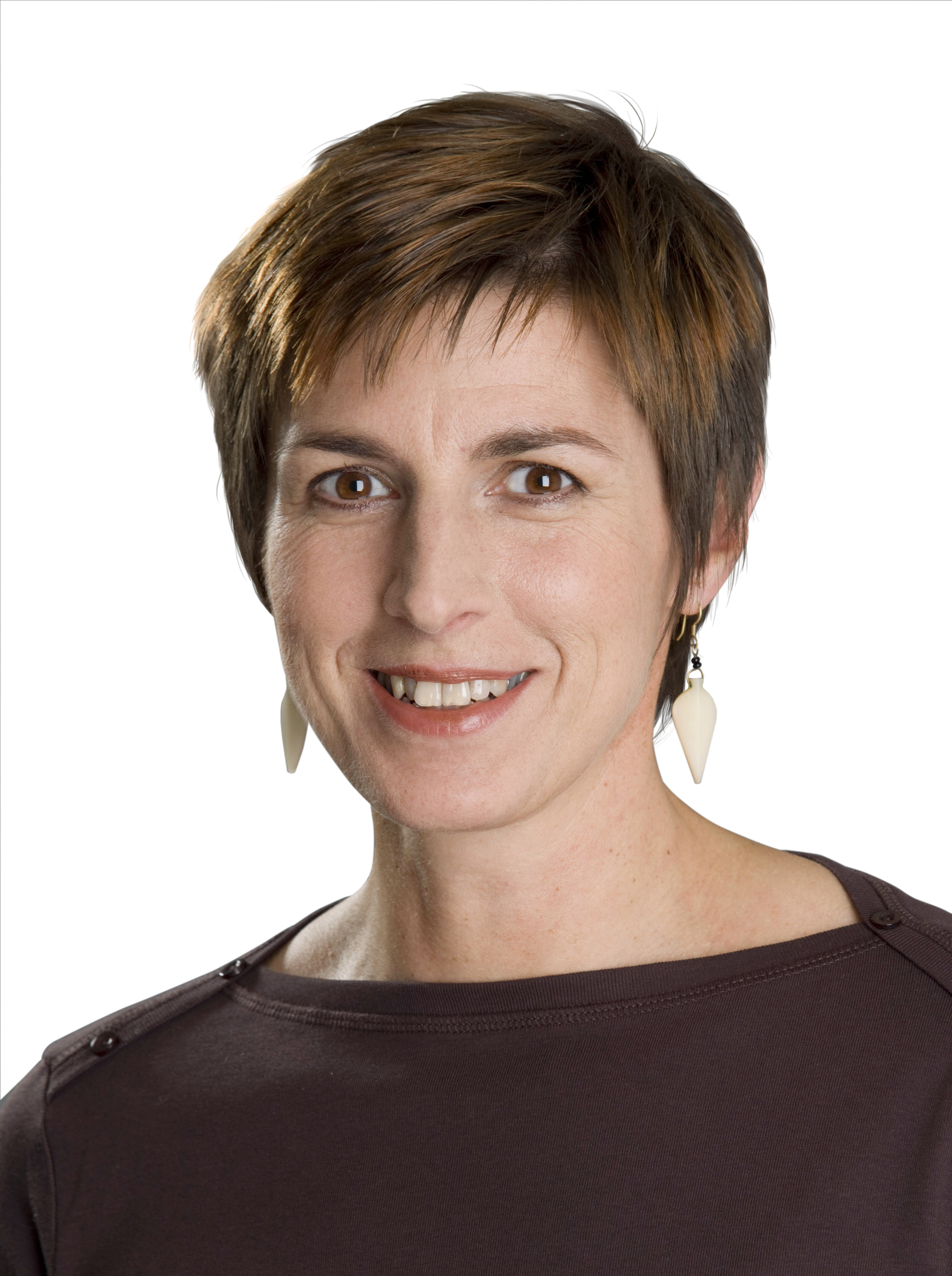

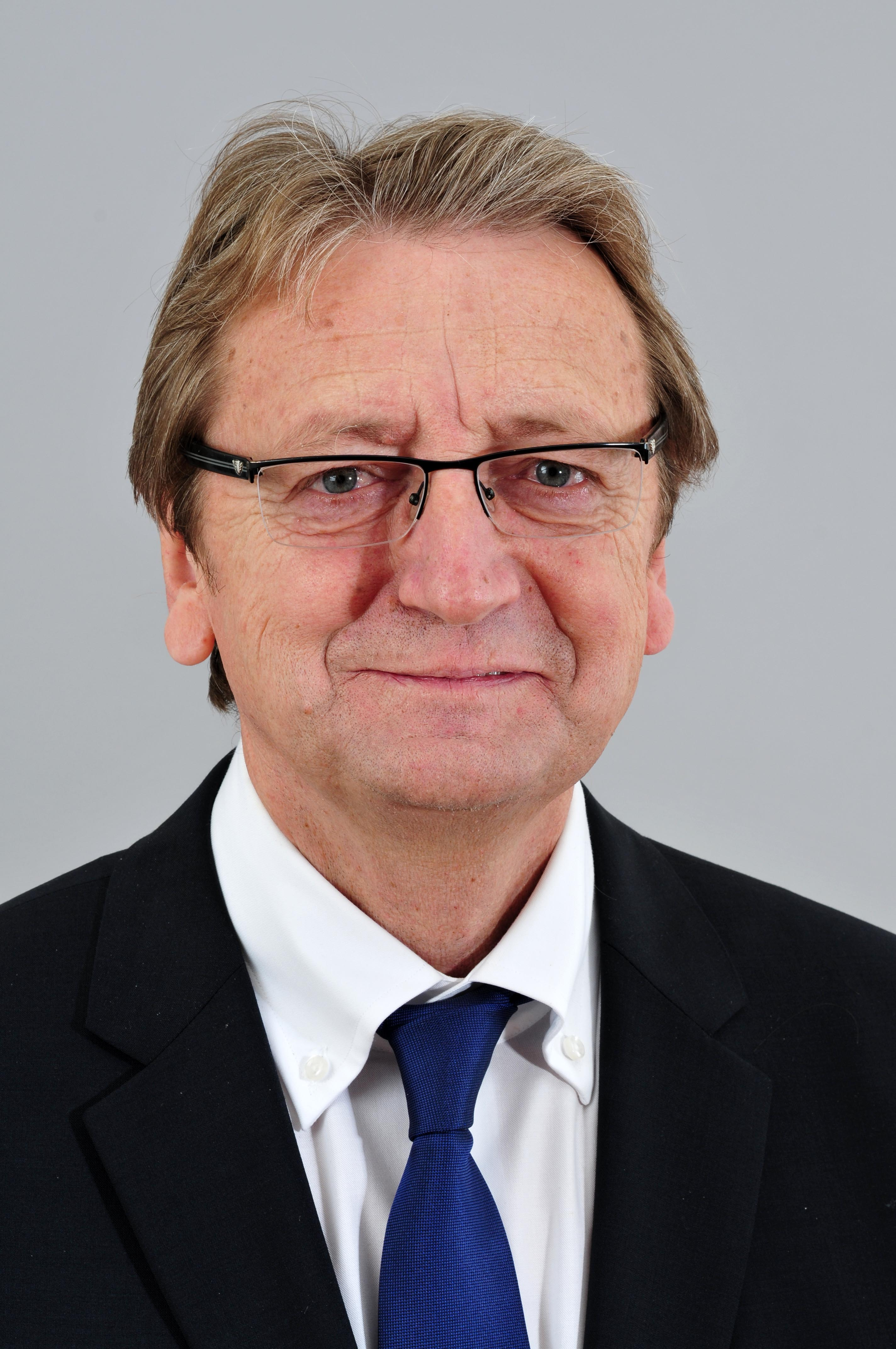

	First party	Second party	Third party
Leader	Wilfried Haslauer Jr.	Gabi Burgstaller	Astrid Rössler
Party	ÖVP	SPÖ	Greens
Last election	14 seats, 36.5%	15 seats, 39.4%	2 seats, 7.4%
Seats won	11	9	7
Seat change	▼3	▼6	▲5
Popular vote	77,312	63,460	53,779
Percentage	29.0%	23.8%	20.2%
Swing	▼7.5%	▼15.6%	▲12.8%
	Fourth party	Fifth party
Leader	Karl Schnell	Hans Mayr
Party	FPÖ	Stronach
Last election	5 seats, 13.0%	Did not exist
Seats won	6	3
Seat change	▲1	▲3
Popular vote	45,387	22,217
Percentage	17.0%	8.3%
Swing	▲4.0%	New party
- Results by municipality. The lighter shade indicates a plurality; the darker shade indicates a majority.
Governor before election
Gabi Burgstaller
SPÖ
Elected Governor
Wilfried Haslauer Jr.
ÖVP

The 2013 Salzburg state election was held on 5 May 2013 to elect the members of the Landtag of Salzburg.

The governing coalition of the Social Democratic Party of Austria (SPÖ) and Austrian People's Party (ÖVP) suffered huge losses. The SPÖ lost suffered a swing of almost 16 percentage points, while the ÖVP lost 7.5; despite its losses, the latter became the largest party in the Landtag. The Greens were the main beneficiary of the government's collapse, taking 20% of votes, their best ever result. The Freedom Party of Austria (FPÖ) made modest gains, while Team Stronach debuted at 8.3%.

Despite its losses, the ÖVP led by Wilfried Haslauer Jr. was the clear victor of the election. The party ultimately succeeded in negotiating a coalition with the Greens and Team Stronach, and Haslauer Jr became the new Governor of Salzburg.

== Background ==
After the 2009 election, the SPÖ remained the largest party and Gabi Burgstaller won her second term as governor, forming a coalition with the ÖVP.

After speculative financial investments by the state became known in December 2012, second deputy Governor and finance minister David Brenner resigned. An oversight committee was formed in January to investigate the scandal. Greens leader Astrid Rössler was chosen as committee chairwoman with the support of the ÖVP, over the FPÖ's candidate Friedrich Wiedermann, who was supported by the SPÖ. After concluding its investigation, the oversight committee recommended the dissolution of the Landtag and the calling of early elections. This was pushed by the ÖVP against the will of Governor Burgstaller, but was nonetheless agreed to. The four parliamentary parties agreed to schedule the election for 5 May 2013.

== Electoral system ==
The 36 seats of the Landtag of Salzburg are elected via open list proportional representation in a two-step process. The seats are distributed between six multi-member constituencies. For parties to receive any representation in the Landtag, they must either win at least one seat in a constituency directly, or clear a 5 percent state-wide electoral threshold. Seats are distributed in constituencies according to the Hare quota, with any remaining seats allocated using the D'Hondt method at the state level, to ensure overall proportionality between a party's vote share and its share of seats.

== Contesting parties ==
The table below lists parties represented in the previous Landtag.

Name		Ideology	Leader	2009 result	
Name		Ideology	Leader	Votes (%)	Seats
SPÖ	Social Democratic Party of Austria; Sozialdemokratische Partei Österreichs	Social democracy	Gabi Burgstaller	39.4%	15 / 36
ÖVP	Austrian People's Party; Österreichische Volkspartei	Christian democracy	Wilfried Haslauer Jr.	36.5%	14 / 36
FPÖ	Freedom Party of Austria; Freiheitliche Partei Österreichs	Right-wing populism Euroscepticism	Karl Schnell	13.0%	5 / 36
GRÜNE	The Greens – The Green Alternative; Die Grünen – Die Grüne Alternative	Green politics	Astrid Rössler	7.4%	2 / 36

In addition to the parties already represented in the Landtag, three parties collected enough signatures to be placed on the ballot:

- Team Stronach (TEAM)
- Pirate Party of Austria (PIRAT) – running only in Salzburg City, Salzburg Surrounds, and Zell am See
- Communist Party of Austria (KPÖ) – running only in Salzburg City and Salzburg Surrounds

== Results ==
Party	Votes	%	+/−	Seats	+/−
Austrian People's Party (ÖVP)	77,312	29.01	–7.54	11	–3
Social Democratic Party of Austria (SPÖ)	63,460	23.83	–15.54	9	–6
The Greens – The Green Alternative (GRÜNE)	53,779	20.18	+12.82	7	+5
Freedom Party of Austria (FPÖ)	45,387	17.03	+4.02	6	+1
Team Stronach (TEAM)	22,217	8.34	New	3	New
Pirate Party of Austria (PIRAT)	3,456	1.30	+1.30	0	±0
Communist Party of Austria (KPÖ)	879	0.33	+0.33	0	±0
Invalid/blank votes	10,107	–	–	–	–
Total	276,597	100	–	36	0
Registered voters/turnout	389,789	70.96	–3.44	–	–
Source: Salzburg State Government

Popular vote
ÖVP	29.01%
SPÖ	23.83%
GRÜNE	20.18%
FPÖ	17.03%
TEAM	8.34%
Other	1.63%

Landtag seats
ÖVP	30.56%
SPÖ	25.00%
GRÜNE	19.44%
FPÖ	16.67%
TEAM	8.33%

=== Results by constituency ===
Constituency	ÖVP		SPÖ		Grüne		FPÖ		TEAM		Others	Total seats	Turnout
Constituency	%	S	%	S	%	S	%	S	%	S	%	Total seats	Turnout
Salzburg City	22.5	2	24.8	2	26.3	2	15.3	1	7.7		3.4	7	63.4
Hallein	31.2	1	24.2		21.7		15.2		7.6			1	74.8
Salzburg Surrounds	30.8	3	19.4	1	22.7	2	16.0	1	8.9		2.1	7	73.0
St. Johann im Pongau	31.1	1	27.1	1	14.2		19.0		8.5			2	74.2
Tamsweg	38.5		24.9		12.3		18.1		6.2			0	75.8
Zell am See	28.9	1	26.6	1	13.9		20.3	1	9.1		1.4	3	72.5
Remaining seats		3		4		3		3		3		16	
Total	29.0	11	23.8	9	20.2	7	17.0	6	8.3	3	1.6	36	71.0
Source: Salzburg State Government

== Aftermath ==
Ahead of the election, both SPÖ Governor Burgstaller and ÖVP lead candidate Wilfried Haslauer Jr stated they would retire from politics if their respective parties failed to place first. On the evening of the election, Burgstaller announced she would resign all political functions. She was subsequently replaced as party leader by Walter Steidl.

Despite its losses, the ÖVP was the clear victor of the election, and Haslauer Jr was the prospective new governor. However, the fragmented parliament promised difficulties in forming a government. He ultimately succeeded in negotiating a coalition with the Greens and Team Stronach. With the exception of Proporz states, this was the first time Team Stronach had joined a state government, with Hans Mayr becoming Minister for Transport, Infrastructure, and Housing. Astrid Rössler of the Greens became deputy governor alongside two other Greens ministers.
