= Karoline Edtstadler =

Austrian lawyer and politician (born 1981)

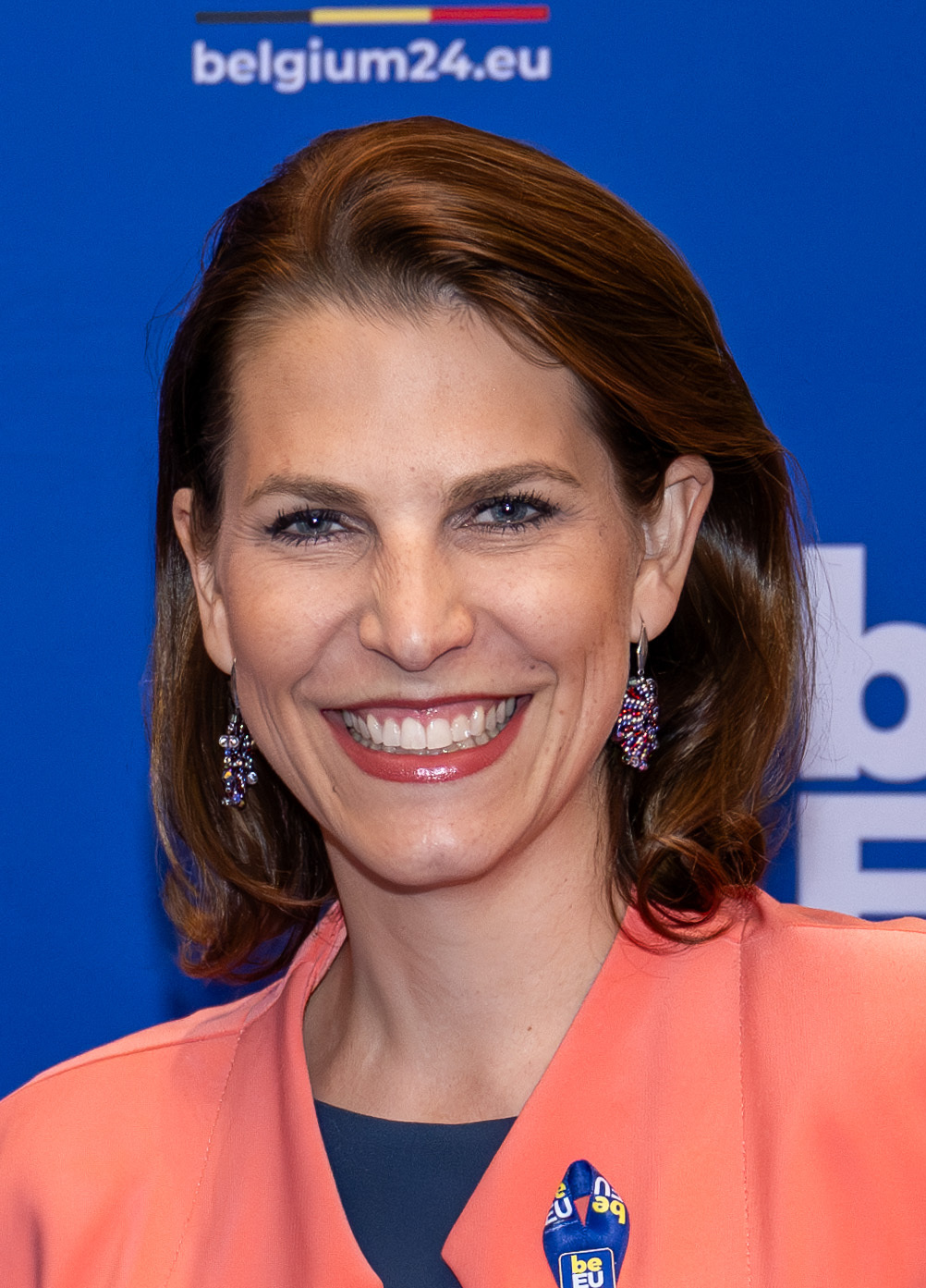
- Edtstadler in 2024

Governor of Salzburg State
- Incumbent
- Assumed office 2 July 2025
- Deputy: Marlene Svazek (FPÖ); Stefan Schnöll (ÖVP)
- Preceded by: Wilfried Haslauer

Federal Minister for the EU and the Constitution at the Federal Chancellery
- In office 29 January 2020 – 3 March 2025
- President: Alexander Van der Bellen
- Chancellor: Sebastian Kurz; Alexander Schallenberg; Karl Nehammer
- Preceded by: Gernot Blümel

Member of the European Parliament
- In office 2 July 2019 – 6 January 2020
- Constituency: Austria

State Secretary of the Interior
- In office 18 December 2017 – 3 June 2019
- President: Alexander Van der Bellen
- Chancellor: Sebastian Kurz
- Minister: Herbert Kickl; Eckart Ratz

Personal details
- Born: 28 March 1981 (age 45) Salzburg, Salzburg State, Austria
- Party: Austrian People's Party; European People's Party

Karoline Stephanie Edtstadler (German: [kaʁoˈliːnɛ ˈɛt.ʃtadlɐ]; born 28 March 1981) is an Austrian lawyer and politician who serves as the Governor of Salzburg state since 2 July 2025, the second woman in this position and the first for the ÖVP. Previously, she served as minister for the EU and the constitution at the Austrian Chancellery in the federal governments of Chancellors Sebastian Kurz, Alexander Schallenberg and Karl Nehammer between 2020 and 2025. A member of the Austrian People's Party (ÖVP), she previously served as Member of the European Parliament (MEP) from 2019 until 2020 and as State Secretary at the Ministry of the Interior from 2017 to 2019.

== Early life and career ==
Edtstadler is the daughter of former director of the Salzburg state provincial parliament Karl W. Edtstadler, and was raised in Elixhausen in the Salzburg-Umgebung district. She attended elementary school in Elixhausen and went on to the Salzburg Fine Arts Gymnasium. Edtstadler studied law at the University of Salzburg and graduated in 2004 with a magistra degree. Court internships at the Mondsee district court and at the Salzburg Regional Court followed. In 2006 she became a judge's candidate at the higher regional court of Linz and in 2008 she became a judge at the Salzburg regional court.

In 2010, Edtstadler passed relatively heavy sentences on two upstanding brothers, who had been charged with injuring a police officer at a demonstration against the asylum policy of minister of the interior Maria Fekter. The higher regional court of Linz reversed the judgements in significant points, as even the public prosecutor considered the sentences to be too heavy. The president of the regional court Hans Rathgeb praised Edtstadler's work at the court: "She was a very goal-oriented and experienced judge".

In October 2011, Edtstadler moved to Section IV (Criminal Law) in the Ministry of Justice. From 2014, she was a personal expert in the cabinet of Minister of Justice Wolfgang Brandstetter, where she was involved in the reform of the criminal code and of criminal law relating to young offenders. In early 2015, she became Senior Prosecutor at the Vienna Corruption Prosecutor's Office, while she remained assigned to the Ministry of Justice. From May 2016 she was a legal employee at the European Court of Human Rights (ECHR) in Strasbourg.

== Political career ==
=== Career in national politics ===
From 2004 to 2006, Edtstadler served as councilor in Henndorf am Wallersee for the ÖVP.

From 2017 until 2019, Edtstadler served as secretary of state in the Austrian Ministry of the Interior, in the government of Chancellor Sebastian Kurz.

=== Member of the European Parliament, 2019–2020 ===
In the 2019 European Parliament election, Edtstadler was number two on her party's list, following Othmar Karas. As Member of the European Parliament, she served on the Committee on Civil Liberties, Justice and Home Affairs and on the Subcommittee on Human Rights. Within the centre-right European People's Party Group (EPP), she led the ÖVP delegation.

=== Return to national politics ===
Since 2020, Edtstadler has been serving as minister for the EU and the Constitution at the Austrian Chancellery in the government of Chancellor Sebastian Kurz. In addition, she has been co-chairing of the EPP European Affairs Ministers Meeting (alongside Helen McEntee), which gathers the centre-right EPP ministers ahead of meetings of the General Affairs Council (GAC).

In 2022, United Nations Secretary-General António Guterres appointed Edtstadler to serve on his inaugural Internet Governance Forum (IGF) Leadership Panel.

=== Salzburg state politics ===
On 28 June 2025, she was elected as new Salzburg state ÖVP party leader. On 2 July 2025, she was elected as new Governor of Salzburg state by the Landtag of Salzburg, following the retirement of Governor Wilfried Haslauer Junior. She previously planned to open a law firm after exiting the Austrian federal government in March 2025, but the planned successor of Haslauer as Governor of Salzburg, Stefan Schnöll, waived the governorship due to private reasons. The ÖVP’s coalition partner in Salzburg, the FPÖ, voted for Edtstadler as the new Governor. The opposition SPÖ also voted for her. Landtag members of the Green Party and the Communist Party Plus voted against her.

== Personal life ==
Edtstadler has a son and lives in Salzburg.
