= Wilfried Haslauer =

Austrian politician and lawyer

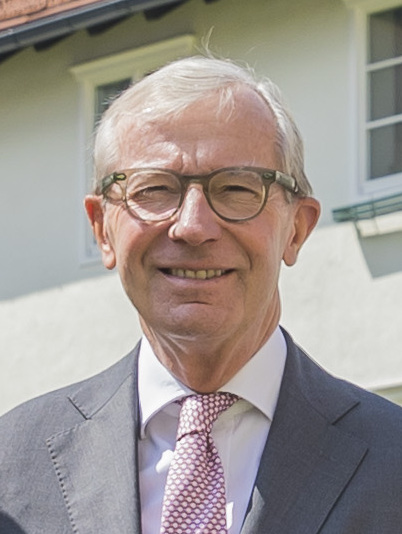

Governor of Salzburg State
- In office 19 June 2013 – 2 July 2025
- Deputy: Marlene Svazek (FPÖ); Stefan Schnöll (ÖVP)
- Preceded by: Gabi Burgstaller
- Succeeded by: Karoline Edtstadler

Personal details
- Born: 3 May 1956 (age 69) Salzburg, Austria
- Party: Salzburg People's Party (federal state level); Austrian People's Party (national level)
- Children: 4

Wilfried Haslauer (born 3 May 1956) is an Austrian politician who was the governor of Salzburg State from 2013 until 2025 as a member of the Austrian People's Party. Prior to his tenure as governor, he served as the deputy governor of Salzburg.

== Early life and education ==
Wilfried Haslauer Jr. was born in Salzburg, Austria, on 3 May 1956. His father Wilfried Haslauer Sr. served as the governor of Salzburg State from 1977 to 1989. From 1966 to 1974, he attended the Academic Grammar School in Salzburg. He served in the Austrian Armed Forces from 1974 to 1975. He is the father of four children.

In 1979, Haslauer graduated with a PhD in law. From 1985 to 2004, he practiced law with four partners in Salzburg. He worked as a lawyer for his father during his tenure as governor. He was the lawyer for a defendant involved in the Kaprun disaster.

== Career ==
Haslauer was the curator of the Seebrunner Kreis think tank and president of the Dr. Wilfried Haslauer Library, which was named after his father. He is a member of the Austrian People's Party (ÖVP).

The Salzburg ÖVP selected Haslauer as its leader in 2004. The Social Democratic Party of Austria (SPÖ) gained control of Salzburg for the first time after winning the 2004 election. In 2004, Haslauer was elected Deputy Governor of Salzburg and retained the position in 2009.

A financial scandal weakened the SPÖ before the 2013 election, which resulted in an ÖVP victory and Haslauer becoming governor despite the ÖVP receiving its lowest percentage of the vote in history. The ÖVP maintained its control after the 2018 election. After the 2023 election he formed a coalition with the Freedom Party of Austria.

In 2025, he announced that he was ending his political career. Karoline Edtstadler, instead of Deputy Governor Stefan Schnöll, was selected by Haslauer to be his successor.

== Honours ==
- Italy: Knight grand cross of the Order of Merit of the Italian Republic (10 February 2020)

== See also ==
- Cabinet Haslauer jun. I

== Works cited ==
=== News ===
- "Haslauer: Edtstadler wurde "liebevoll zum Feindbild hochstilisiert"". Die Presse. 31 January 2025. Archived from the original on 19 June 2025.
- "Landeshauptmann führt ÖVP zu alter Größe". Kleine Zeitung. 22 April 2018. Archived from the original on 19 June 2025.
- Bauer, Gernot (15 June 2025). "Haslauer im Abschiedsinterview: "Ich werde in Zukunft nicht nur Rasen mähen"". Profil. Archived from the original on 19 June 2025.
- Fercher, Wolfgang (21 April 2018). ""Türkis war eine PR-Maßnahme"". Kleine Zeitung. Archived from the original on 19 June 2025.
- Huber, Heidi (13 March 2023). "Der nächste Landesfürst, der zittern muss". Kleine Zeitung. Archived from the original on 19 June 2025.

=== Web ===
- "CV by Governor Wilfried Haslauer". Salzburg. Archived from the original on 19 June 2025.
- "Dr. Wilfried Haslauer". Austrian Parliament. Archived from the original on 19 June 2025.
- "Wilfried Haslauer". Salzburg Summit. Archived from the original on 19 June 2025.
