= Gerlind Plonka =

German applied mathematician

Gerlind Plonka-Hoch is a German applied mathematician specializing in signal processing and image processing, and known for her work on refinable functions and curvelets. She is a professor at the University of Göttingen, in the Institute for Numerical and Applied Mathematics.

Plonka earned her Ph.D. from the University of Rostock in 1993. Her dissertation, Periodische Lagrange- und Hermite-Spline-Interpolation, concerned polynomial interpolation using Lagrange polynomials and Hermite splines, and was supervised by Manfred Tasche.

She was the Emmy Noether Lecturer of the German Mathematical Society in 2016.

== Book ==
- with Potts, Daniel; Steidl, Gabriele; Tasche, Manfred (2018). Numerical Fourier Analysis. Applied and Numerical Harmonic Analysis. Birkhäuser Cham. doi:10.1007/978-3-030-04306-3. ISBN 978-3-030-04305-6. S2CID 126498748.
