= Gabriele Steidl =

German mathematician

- Born: 1963 (age 62–63); Prenzlau
- Education: University of Rostock
- Awards: SIAM Fellow
- Scientific career
- Fields: Mathematics
- Workplaces: Technische Universität Berlin; Technical University of Kaiserslautern; University of Mannheim; Technische Universität Darmstadt

Gabriele Steidl (born Drauschke, 1963) is a German mathematician whose research interests include computational harmonic analysis, convex optimization, and image processing. She is a professor of mathematics at Technische Universität Berlin.

== Education and career ==
Steidl studied mathematics at the University of Rostock, earning a doctorate (Dr. rer. nat.) in 1988 and completing her habilitation in 1991. Her doctoral dissertation, Grundlagen schneller Algorithmen für verallgemeinerte diskrete Fouriertransformationen, concerned fast algorithms for the discrete Fourier transform and was supervised by Manfred Tasche.

After consulting for a German insurance association, she became an assistant professor at Technische Universität Darmstadt in 1993. She moved to the University of Mannheim as a professor in 1996, and moved again to the Technical University of Kaiserslautern in 2011 before taking her present position at Technische Universität Berlin in 2020. From 2020-21, she is program director of the SIAM Activity Group on Imaging Science.

== Book ==
- with Plonka, Gerlind; Potts, Daniel; Tasche, Manfred (2018). Numerical Fourier Analysis. Applied and Numerical Harmonic Analysis. Birkhäuser Cham. doi:10.1007/978-3-030-04306-3. ISBN 978-3-030-04305-6. S2CID 126498748.

== Recognition ==
Steidl was elected as a Fellow of the Society for Industrial and Applied Mathematics, in the 2022 Class of SIAM Fellows, "for contributions to computational harmonic analysis and imaging sciences".
