= Brigitta Pallauf =

Austrian politician (born 1960)

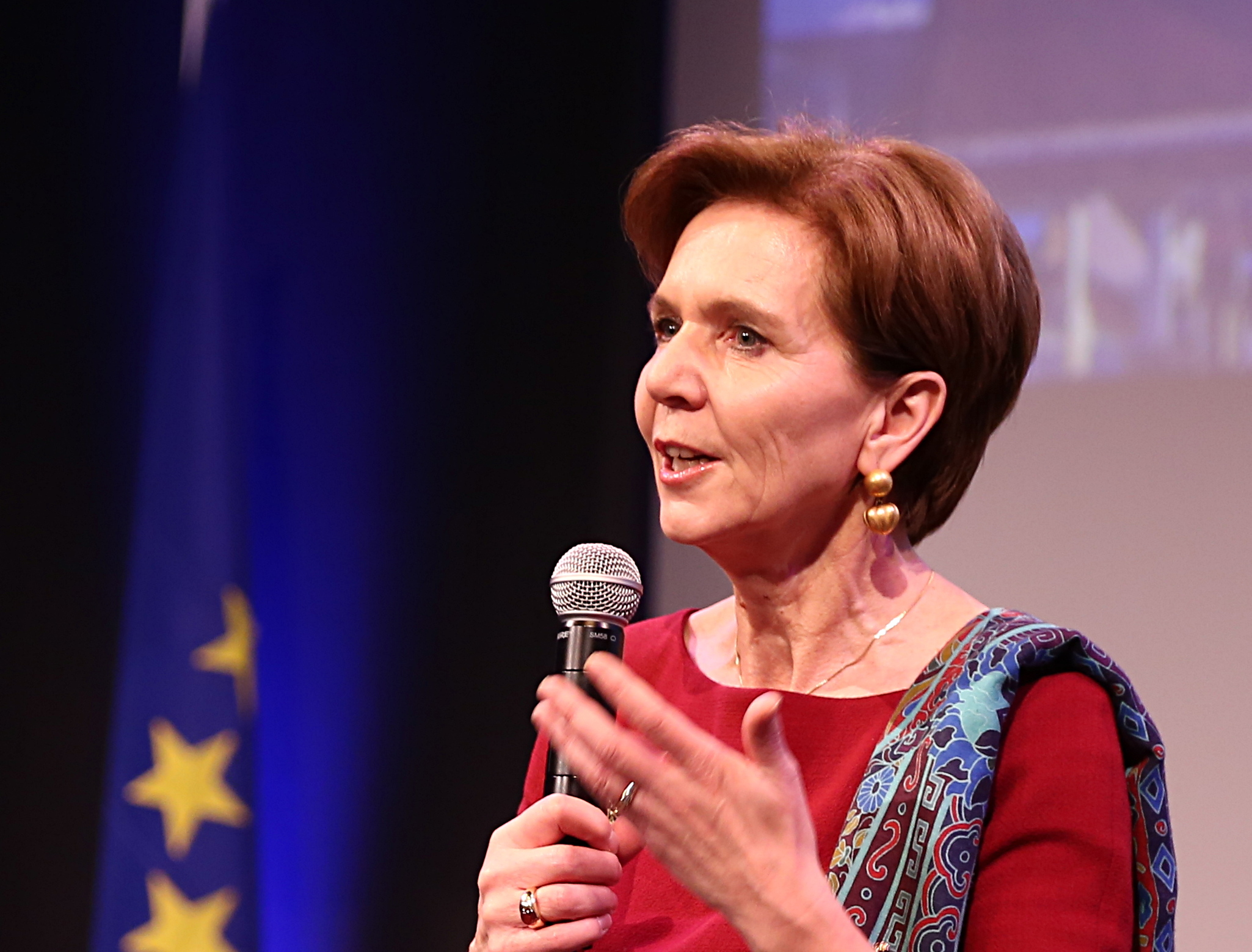
- Pallauf at EUSALP 2017, Munich

President of the Salzburg state parliament
- Incumbent
- Assumed office June 13th, 2018
- In office June 19th, 2013 – January 30th, 2018

Personal details
- Born: 26 November 1960 (age 65) Schwanenstadt
- Party: Austrian People's Party
- Education: University of Salzburg

Brigitta Pallauf (born 26 November 1960) is an Austrian politician. She has been president of the Salzburg state parliament between 2013 and January 2018, and June 2018 to the present.

== Life ==
Pallauf attended the Gunskirchen primary school between 1967 and 1971 and later, until 1979, attended a girl's secondary school in Wels. She studied law at the University of Salzburg, and received her doctorate in 1983.

She then completed a postgraduate degree in European law at Hofen Castle from 1995 to 1996 and graduated in 1996 as an academically certified expert in European law.

== Politics ==
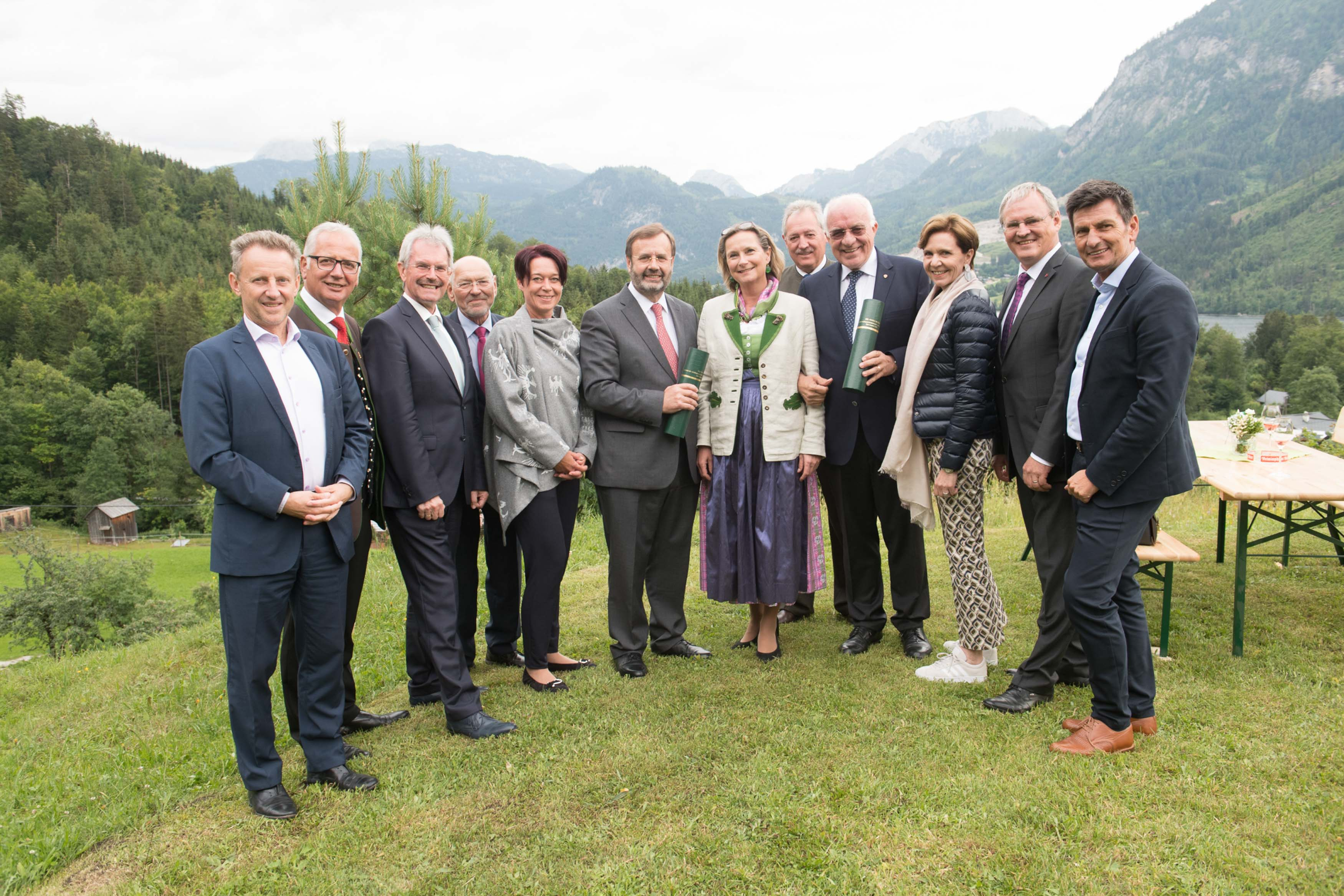
Pallauf at the Conference of the presidents of the State Parliament.

Since June 2007 she has been the financial officer of the Salzburg Women's ÖVP, and since 22 April 2009 she has led the ÖVP in the Salzburg State Parliament and has been the spokeswoman for art and music, women and civil relations.

On 15 January 2018, Hans Mayr tendered his resignation as regional councillor, and Pallauf followed, to become a state councillor.
