= Niederthalheim =

- Municipality
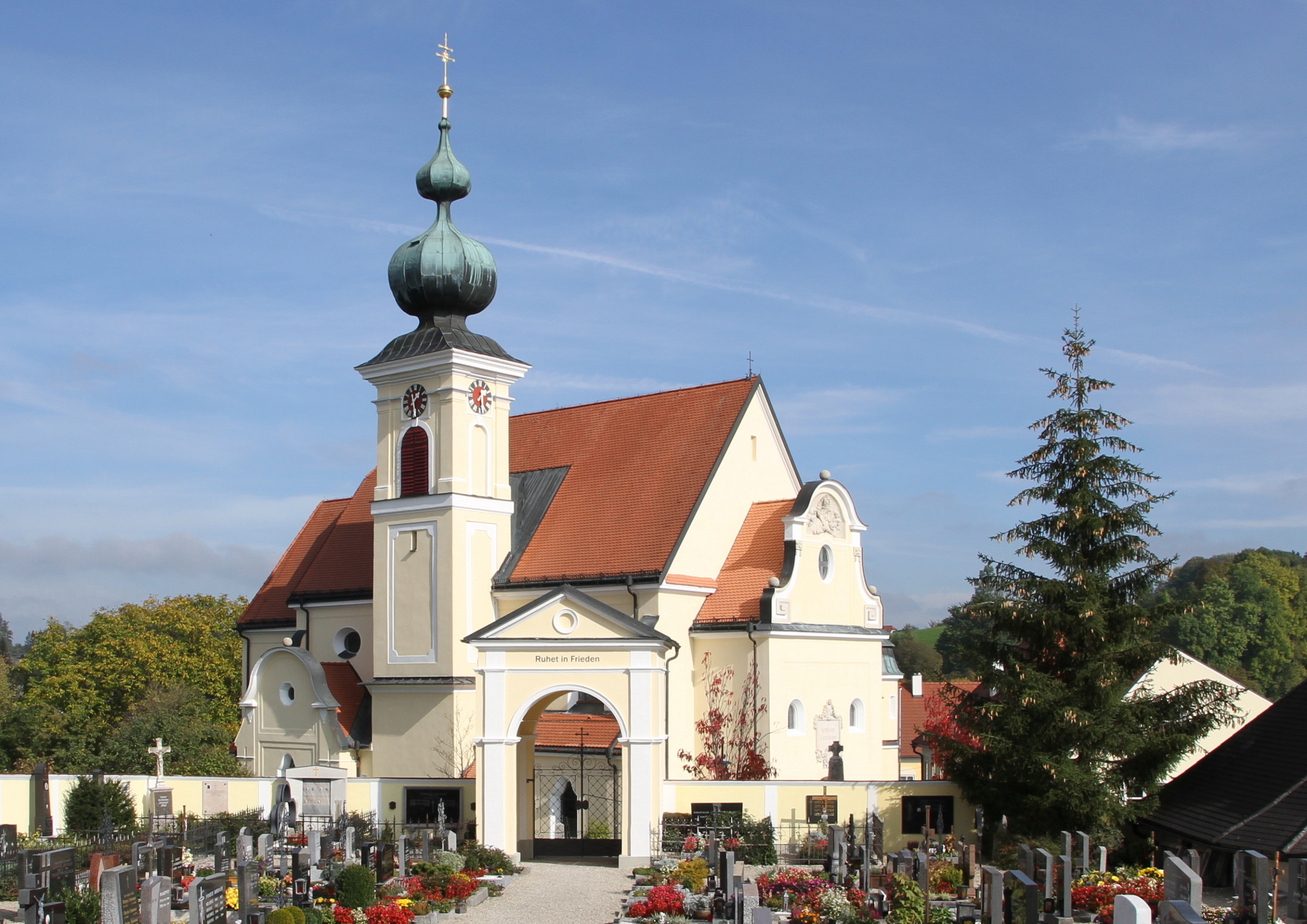

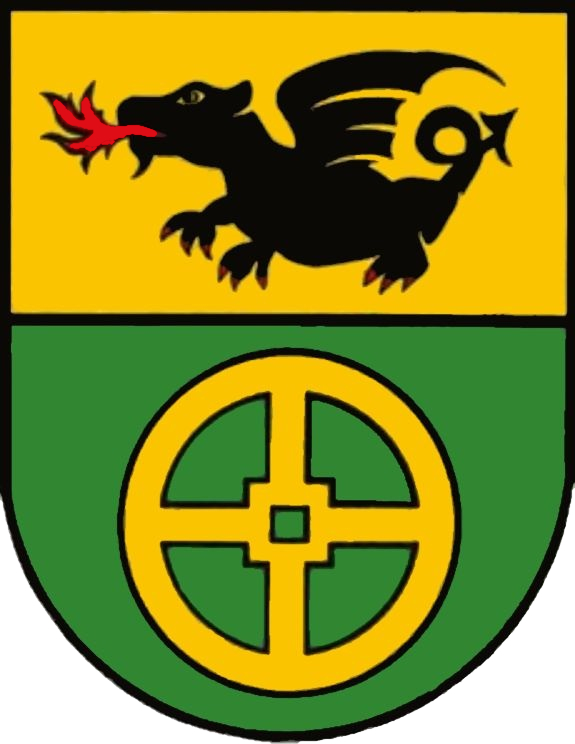
- Coat of arms

- Location within Austria
- Coordinates: 48°06′00″N 13°46′06″E
- Country: Austria
- State: Upper Austria
- District: Vöcklabruck

Government
  - Mayor: Johann Öhlinger (ÖVP)

Area
  - Total: 15.37 km^{2} (5.93 sq mi)
- Elevation: 431 m (1,414 ft)

Population (2018-01-01)
  - Total: 1,125
  - Density: 73.19/km^{2} (189.6/sq mi)
- Time zone: UTC+1 (CET)
  - Summer (DST): UTC+2 (CEST)
- Postal code: 4692
- Area code: 07673
- Vehicle registration: VB
- Website: www.niederthalheim.at

Niederthalheim is a municipality in the Austrian state of Upper Austria.

== Politics ==
=== Local council ===
Total 13 seats
- Austrian People's Party: 8
- Freedom Party of Austria: 3
- Social Democratic Party of Austria: 1
- Pirate Party of Austria: 1

== Population ==
Historical population
Year	Pop.	±%
1991	1,068	—
2001	1,076	+0.7%
2016	1,086	+0.9%
