= Marlene Svazek =

Austrian politician (born 1992)

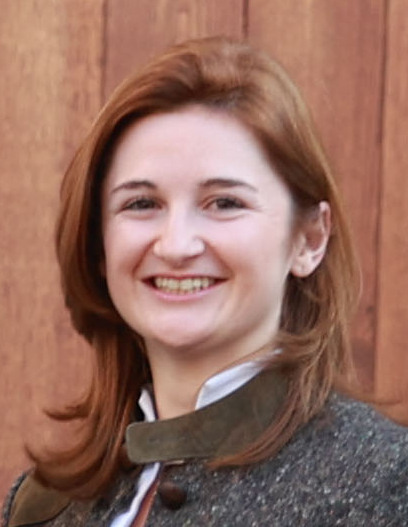
- Svazek in 2023

Deputy Governor of Salzburg
- Incumbent
- Assumed office 14 June 2023
- Governor: Wilfried Haslauer; Karoline Edtstadler
- Preceded by: Christian Stöckl

Personal details
- Born: 13 May 1992 (age 33)
- Party: Freedom Party

Marlene Svazek (born 13 May 1992) is an Austrian politician serving as deputy governor of Salzburg since 2023. From 2017 to 2018, she was a member of the National Council.
