= Gabi Burgstaller =

Austrian politician (born 1963)

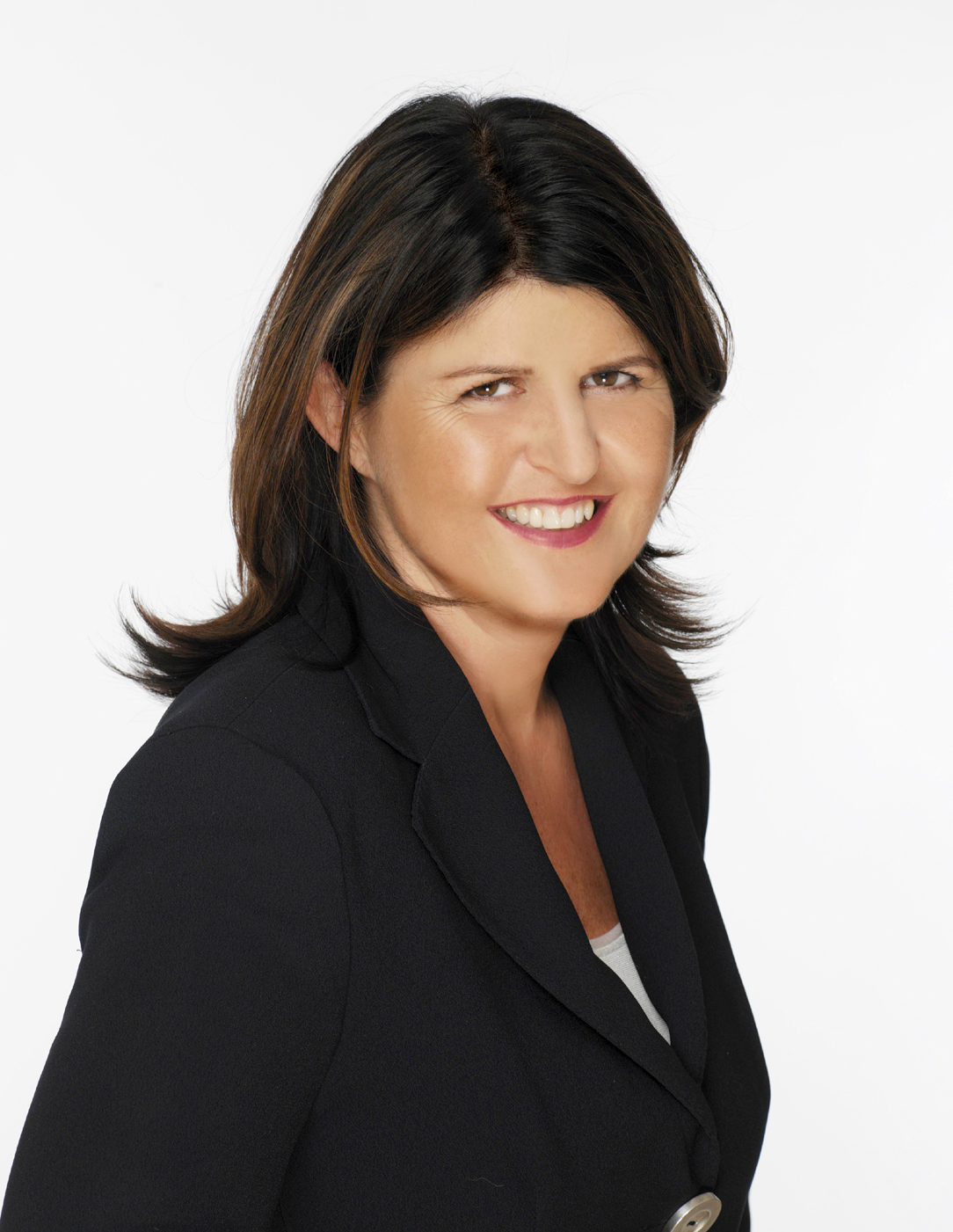
- Burgstaller in 2007

Governor of Salzburg
- In office 28 April 2004 – 19 June 2013
- Preceded by: Franz Schausberger
- Succeeded by: Wilfried Haslauer

Personal details
- Born: Gabriele Burgstaller; 23 May 1963 (age 63) Penetzdorf, Niederthalheim, Upper Austria
- Party: Social Democratic Party of Austria
- Education: University of Salzburg

Gabi Burgstaller (born 23 May 1963) is an Austrian politician, and the former governor (Landeshauptfrau) of the federal state of Salzburg.

== Life ==
She was born in Penetzdorf/Niederthalheim near Schwanenstadt in Upper Austria. After matriculation at a high school in Gmunden and one year abroad in England, she studied law at the University of Salzburg. From 1987 until 1989, she worked as an assistant at the Institutes for Constitutional and Administrative Law, and Sociology of Law respectively at the same university. From 1989, Burgstaller worked as a consumer consultant at the Salzburg Chamber of Labour. There, specializing in residential rights and tenancy law, she earned an excellent reputation acting on behalf of 25,000 investors defrauded by the WEB-IMMAG building trust company.

In 1994, she started her political career as a member of the Salzburg federal state government, where she acted as chairperson of the Austrian Social Democratic Party (SPÖ) from the beginning. On 27 April 1999, Burgstaller was elected State Councillor in Salzburg State's government. In the government Burgstaller was responsible for female concerns, construction, trade, consumerism, and transport.

On 31 March 2001, Burgstaller was elected as the first woman to head Salzburg's Social Democratic Party with an approval of 98% of delegates. On 25 April, she was appointed as first deputy governor of the federal state of Salzburg. Her agendas included the purviews of communities, health and youth issues, and again female concerns and consumerism.

Following an election victory for the social democrats, Gabi Burgstaller became federal state governor on 28 April 2004. She was Salzburg State's first female governor, the second female governor in Austrian history (after Waltraud Klasnic), and the first post-World War II governor of Salzburg State not from the ÖVP.

She won the 2009 Salzburg State elections with a 39.4% of the votes, losing a 6.0% and two seats, from 17 to 15.

After a major financial scandal striking the administration of Salzburg State she sustained a historic loss in the elections on 5 May 2013. SPÖ lost 15.56% and Burgstaller resigned. She was succeeded as governor by Wilfried Haslauer (ÖVP).
