= Walter Steidl =

Austrian politician (born 1957)

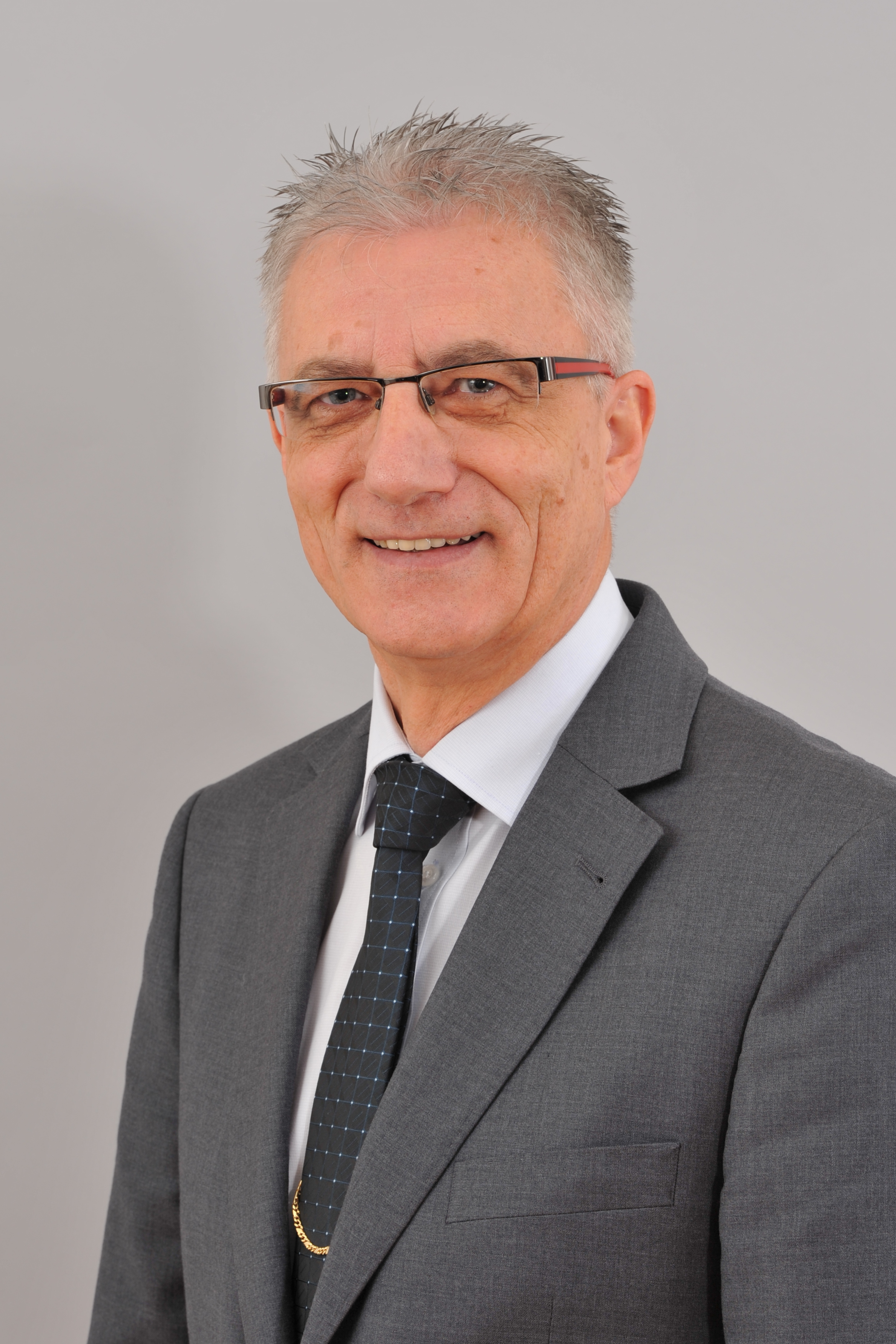
- Walter Steidl 2012
- Incumbent
- Assumed office 1999

Personal details
- Born: 28 August 1957 (age 68)
- Party: SPÖ

Walter Steidl (28 August 1957) is an Austrian politician (SPÖ) and has been a deputy of the Salzburger Landtag since 1999. He was chairman of the SPÖ-Landtagsfraktion from 2007 to 2009.

Steidl graduated from an Electrician apprenticeship in 1972 and continued practicing his profession until 1978. In the period from 1983 to 1984 he graduated from the Social Academy in Vienna and since July 2003 has been director of the Gewerkschaft der Privatangestellten (Union of salaried employees), printing, journalism and paper (GPA-djp) Salzburg. Previously, he was secretary of the GPA. Since 1995, Steidl was a deputy in the Salzburger Landtag and committee speaker for the labor market, Energy and Sports. On 18 September 2012 he was nominated to succeed Cornelia Schmidjell as Minister of Social affairs in the Landesregierung Burgstaller II on 3 October 2012. After the resignation of Gabi Burgstaller as a result of the Landtagswahl in Salzburg 2013, in which the SPÖ suffered a great loss, he took his position as chairman of SPÖ Salzburg.

Steidl is married and a father of four children
