= List of governors of Salzburg (state) =

This is a list of governors of the Austrian state of Salzburg:

№	Portrait	Name	Term			Period	Note
№	Portrait	Name	Took office	Left office	Duration	Period	Note
Habsburg monarchy Governors of the Salzach district, subject to the Provincial governor of Upper Austria (1816–1849)						Habsburg monarchy (1860–1918)	
		Karl Graf Welsperg-Raitenau	1816	1825		Habsburg monarchy (1860–1918)	
		Johann Nepomuk Freiherr von Stiebar	1825	1831		Habsburg monarchy (1860–1918)	
		Albert Graf Montecuccoli	1831	1838		Habsburg monarchy (1860–1918)	
		Franz Graf Mercandiu	1838	1838		Habsburg monarchy (1860–1918)	
		Leopold Friedrich Graf Stolberg-Stolberg	1838	9 August 1840		Habsburg monarchy (1860–1918)	
		Gustav Ignaz Graf Chorinsky	1840	1849		Habsburg monarchy (1860–1918)	
Presidents of the province of Salzburg (1850–1918), assisted by Provincial Governors (1861–1918)						Habsburg monarchy (1860–1918)	
		Friedrich Graf Herberstein	1850	1852		Habsburg monarchy (1860–1918)	
		Karl Prinz Lobkowitz	1852	1855		Habsburg monarchy (1860–1918)	
		Otto Franz Graf Fünfkirchen	1855	1859		Habsburg monarchy (1860–1918)	
		Ernst Graf Gourcy-Droitaumont	1860	1860		Habsburg monarchy (1860–1918)	
		Franz Freiherr von Spiegelfeld	1861	1863		Habsburg monarchy (1860–1918)	Provincial governors: Joseph Freiherr von Weiß (31 March 1861 – 20 September 1872)
		Eduard Viscount Taaffee	1863	1867		Habsburg monarchy (1860–1918)	Provincial governors: Joseph Freiherr von Weiß (31 March 1861 – 20 September 1872)
		Karl Graf Coronini-Cronberg	1867	1869		Habsburg monarchy (1860–1918)	Provincial governors: Joseph Freiherr von Weiß (31 March 1861 – 20 September 1872)
		Ernst Graf Gourcy-Droitaumont	1869	1870		Habsburg monarchy (1860–1918)	Provincial governors: Joseph Freiherr von Weiß (31 March 1861 – 20 September 1872)
		Prince Adolf of Auersperg	1870	1871		Habsburg monarchy (1860–1918)	Provincial governors: Joseph Freiherr von Weiß (31 March 1861 – 20 September 1872)
		Sigmund Graf Thun-Hohenstein	1872	1897		Habsburg monarchy (1860–1918)	Hugo Raimund Reichsgraf Lamberg (30 September 1872 – 14 June 1880)
		Sigmund Graf Thun-Hohenstein	1872	1897		Habsburg monarchy (1860–1918)	Carl Graf Chorinsky (17 June 1880 – 30 October 1890)
		Sigmund Graf Thun-Hohenstein	1872	1897		Habsburg monarchy (1860–1918)	Dr. Albert Schumacher (21 September 1890 – 17 January 1897)
		Klemens Graf St. Julien-Wallsee	1897	1908		Habsburg monarchy (1860–1918)	Fr. Alois Winkler (17 January 1897 – 29 December 1902)
		Klemens Graf St. Julien-Wallsee	1897	1908		Habsburg monarchy (1860–1918)	Dr. Albert Schumacher (29 December 1902 – 21 July 1909)
		Levin Graf Schaffgotsch	1908	1913		Habsburg monarchy (1860–1918)	Dr. Albert Schumacher (29 December 1902 – 21 July 1909)
		Levin Graf Schaffgotsch	1908	1913		Habsburg monarchy (1860–1918)	Fr. Alois Winkler (21 July 1909 – 23 April 1919)
		Levin Graf Schaffgotsch	Party	Took office		Habsburg monarchy (1860–1918)	Left office
		Oskar Meyer	Christian Social	23 April 1919		First Republic (1918–1934)	4 May 1922
		Franz Rehrl	Christian Social; Fatherland's Front	4 May 1922		Austrofascism (1934–1938)	12 March 1938
(State governor and Gauleiter)						Nazi Germany (1938–1945)	
		Anton Wintersteiger	NSDAP	13 March 1938		Nazi Germany (1938–1945)	22 May 1938
		Friedrich Rainer	NSDAP	22 May 1938		Nazi Germany (1938–1945)	29 November 1941
		Gustav Adolf Scheel	NSDAP	29 November 1941		Nazi Germany (1938–1945)	4 May 1945
		Adolf Schemel	People's Party (ÖVP)	23 May 1945		Second Republic (1945–present)	12 December 1945
		Albert Hochleitner	ÖVP	12 December 1945		Second Republic (1945–present)	4 December 1948
		Josef Rehrl	ÖVP	4 December 1948		Second Republic (1945–present)	1 December 1949
		Josef Klaus	ÖVP	1 December 1949		Second Republic (1945–present)	17 April 1961
		Hans Lechner	ÖVP	17 April 1961		Second Republic (1945–present)	20 April 1977
		Wilfried Haslauer senior	ÖVP	20 April 1977		Second Republic (1945–present)	2 May 1989
		Hans Katschthaler	ÖVP	2 May 1989		Second Republic (1945–present)	24 April 1996
		Franz Schausberger	ÖVP	24 April 1996		Second Republic (1945–present)	28 April 2004
		Gabi Burgstaller	Social Democratic (SPÖ)	28 April 2004		Second Republic (1945–present)	19 June 2013
		Wilfried Haslauer	ÖVP	19 June 2013		Second Republic (1945–present)	2 July 2025
		Karoline Edtstadler	ÖVP	2 July 2025		Second Republic (1945–present)	Incumbent

== See also ==
- Salzburg
