= Keutschach am See =

Municipality in Carinthia, Austria

- Municipality
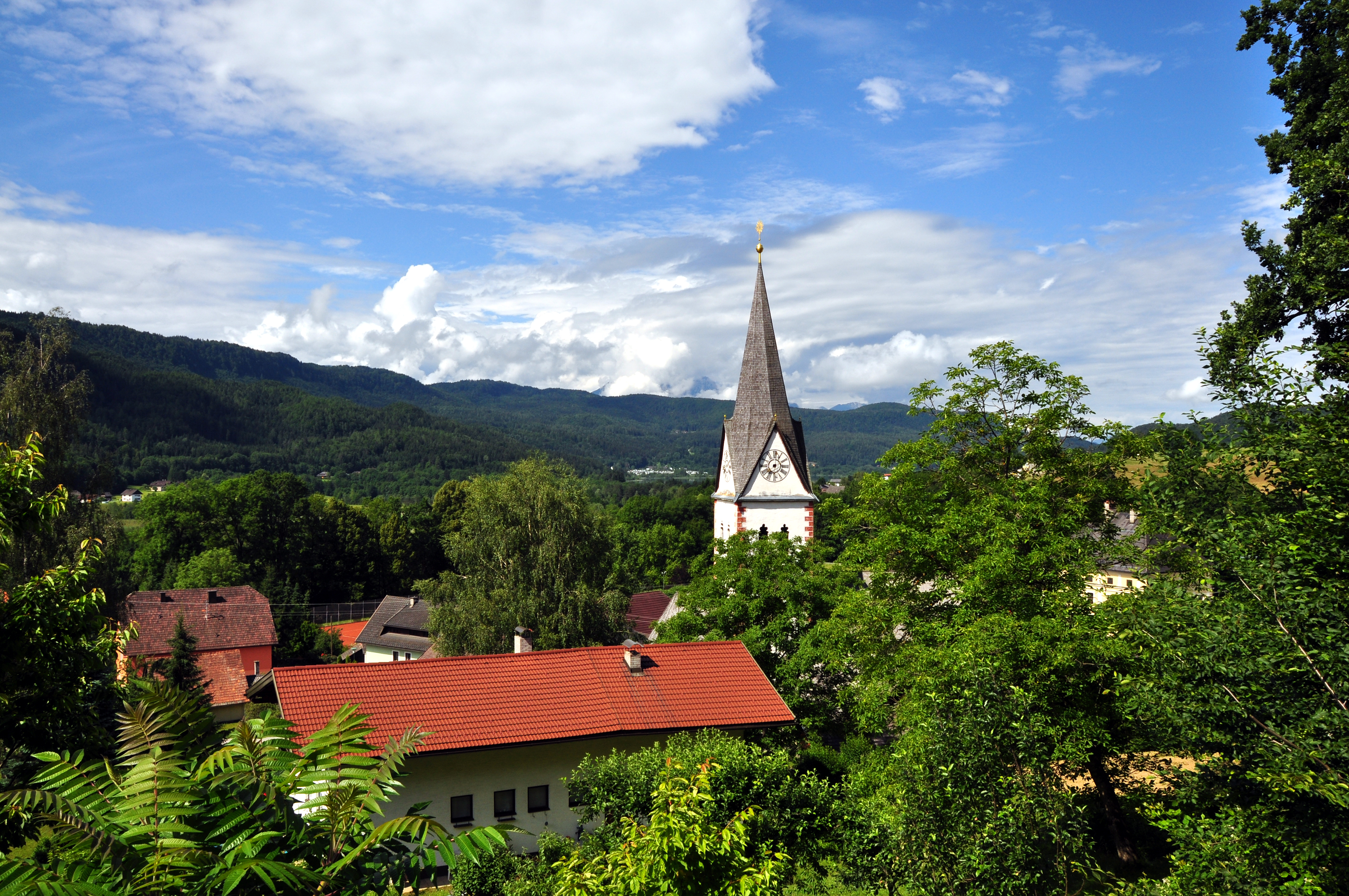

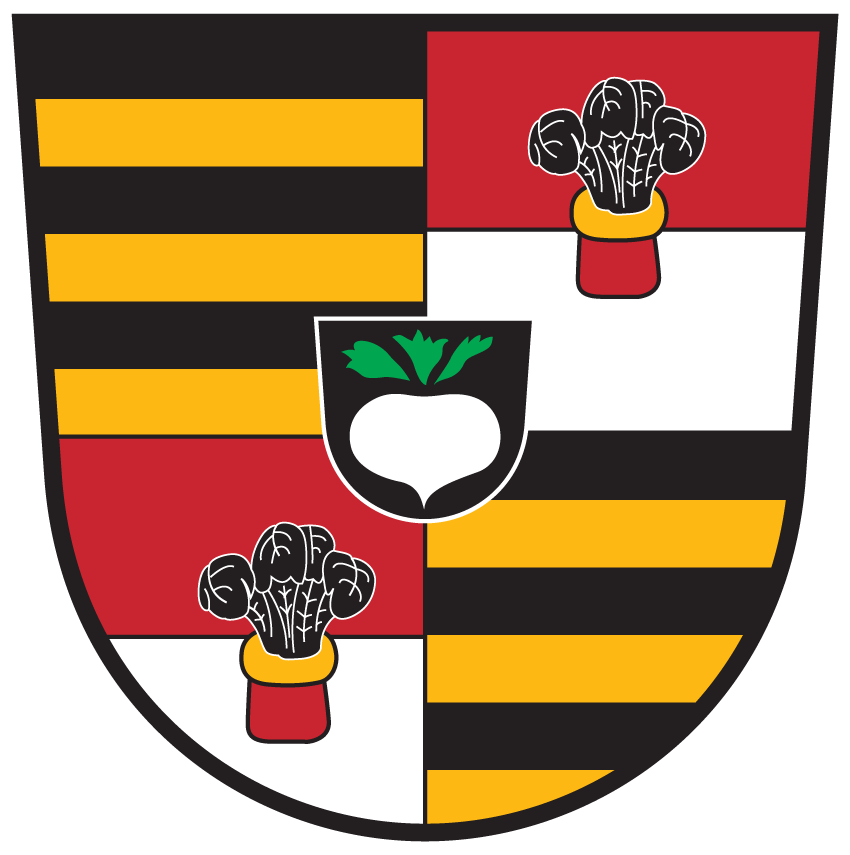
- Coat of arms

- Location within Austria
- Coordinates: 46°35′N 14°11′E
- Country: Austria
- State: Carinthia
- District: Klagenfurt-Land

Government
  - Mayor: Gerhard Oleschko

Area
  - Total: 28.36 km^{2} (10.95 sq mi)
- Elevation: 535 m (1,755 ft)

Population (2018-01-01)
  - Total: 2,450
  - Density: 86.4/km^{2} (224/sq mi)
- Time zone: UTC+1 (CET)
  - Summer (DST): UTC+2 (CEST)
- Postal code: 9074
- Area code: 04273
- Website: Tourism-Homepage Official Homepage

Keutschach am See (Slovene: Hodiše ob jezeru) is a municipality in the district of Klagenfurt-Land in the Austrian state of Carinthia.

== Geography ==
The municipality lies in a glacial valley between the Wörthersee Lake and Mt. Pyramidenkogel on the north and the summits of the Sattnitz range on the south. It lies on the east bank of the Keutschacher See, about 15 km (9.3 mi) west of the state capital, Klagenfurt. Other nearby lakes include Hafnersee, Baßgeigensee, and Rauschelesee. Large parts of the valley since 1970 form a protected landscape area.

=== Populated places ===
The municipality of Keutschach am See consists of the following cadastral communities: Keutschach (Hodiše), Plescherken (Plešerka), and St. Nikolai (Šmiklavž); while further subdivided into populated places (with population in brackets as of 1 January 2022).

- Dobein (Dobajna) (31)
- Dobeinitz (Dobajnica) (94)
- Höflein (Dvorec) (146)
- Höhe (Na Gori) (146)
- Keutschach (Hodiše) (463)

- Leisbach (Ležbe) (119)
- Linden (Lipa) (105)
- Pertitschach (Prtiče) (194)
- Plaschischen (Plašišče) (107)
- Plescherken (Plešerka) (219)

- Rauth (Rut) (287)
- Reauz (Rjavec) (301)
- St. Margarethen (Šmarjeta) (83)
- St. Nikolai (Šmiklavž) (66)
- Schelesnitz (Železnica) (44)

== Population ==
According to the 2001 census 5.6% of the population are Carinthian Slovenes.

Village (German)	Village (Slovenian)	Number of People (1991)	Percent of Slovenes (1991)	Percent of Slovenes (1951)
Dobein	Dobajna	38	26.3%	81.0%
Höflein	Dvorec	138	10.1%	96.1%
Plaschischen	Plašišče	106	14.2%	51.9%
Plescherken	Plešerka	188	23.9%	28.7%
Pertitschach	Prtiče	150	13.3%	81.5%
Rauth	Rut	236	14.8%	76.3%
St.Margarethen	Šmarjeta	64	12.1%	92.3%
St.Nikolai	Šmiklavž	61	19.7%	97.6%
Keutschach	Hodiše	260	4.2%	38.8%
Leisbach	Ležbe	96	1%	59.7%
Linden	Lipa	121	4.1%	81.9%
Dobeinitz	Dobajnica			
Höhe	Na Gori			
Reauz	Rjavec			
Schelesnitz	Železnica			

== History ==
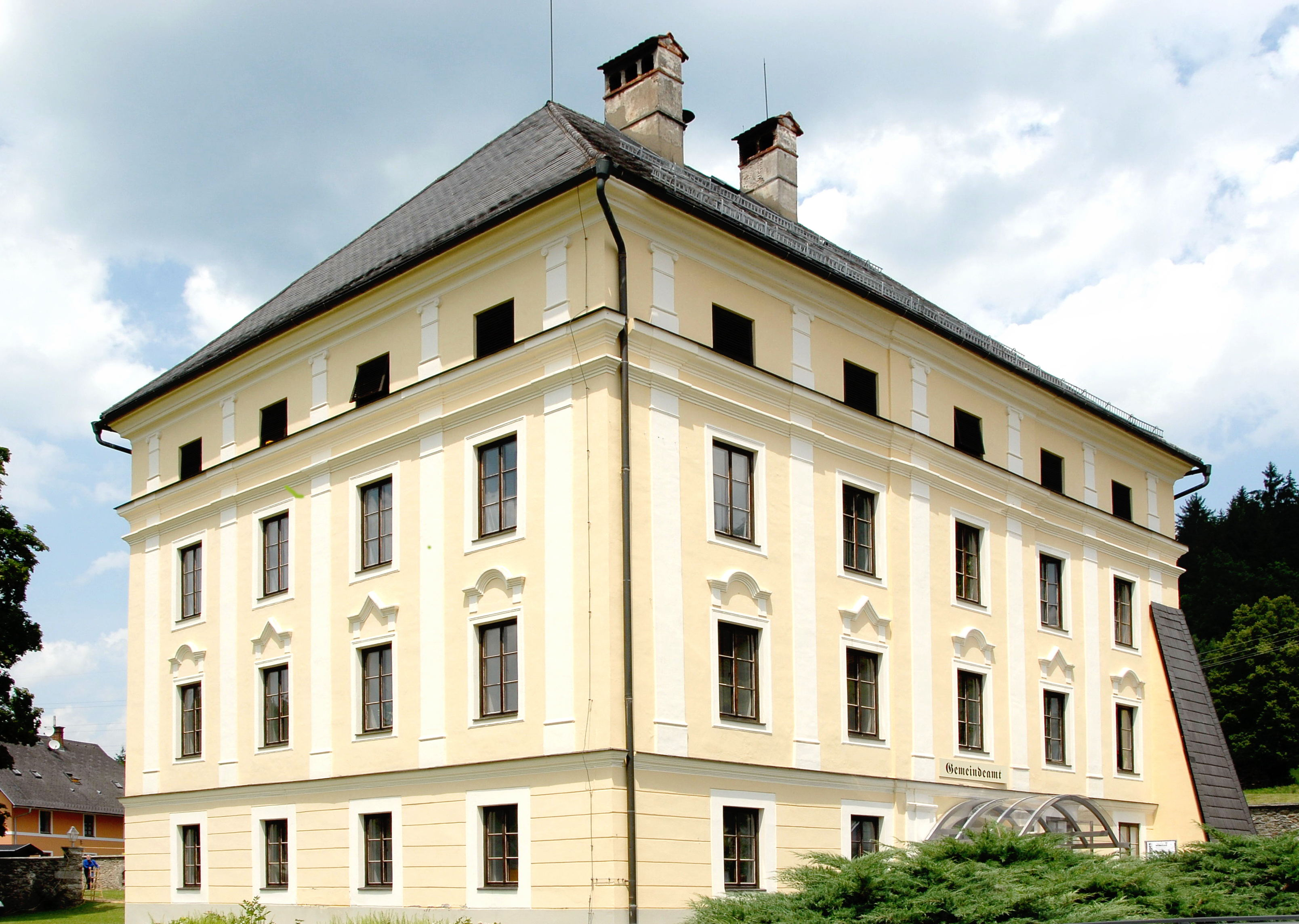
New Castle, seat of the municipal office

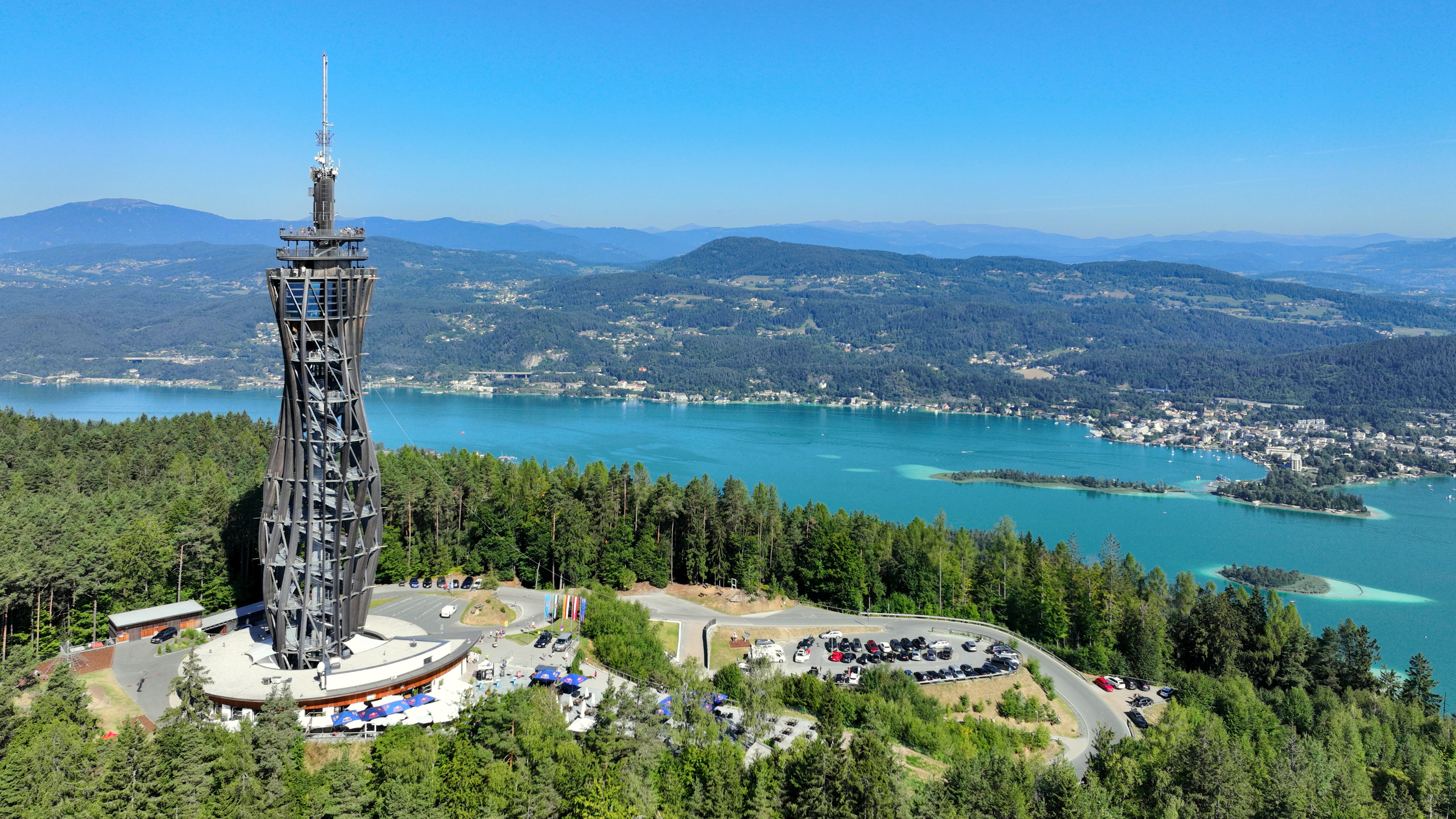
Pyramidenkogel Tower with Wörthersee in the background

Chodesach in the Duchy of Carinthia was first mentioned in an 1150 deed. The estates were the ancestral seat of the Keutschach noble family, documented since 1299, whose most noted scion was Leonhard von Keutschach (c.1442–1519), Prince-Archbishop of Salzburg from 1495 until his death. In the early 16th century, the dynasty had a Renaissance castle erected, which later was replaced by a nearby Baroque building, called the "New Castle" (Neues Schloss), finished in 1679 and rebuilt under the Orsini-Rosenberg noble family in the 18th century.

For centuries, agriculture was the most practised economic system until summer tourism became more and more important during the 20th century. Nowadays tourism is the biggest source of income in this town.

== Politics ==
Seats in the municipal assembly (Gemeinderat) as of 2015 local elections:

- Social Democratic Party of Austria (SPÖ): 7
- Parteifreie Liste Gerhard Oleschko (-PLO-): 5
- Austrian People's Party (ÖVP): 4
- Green Unity List (GEL): 2
- Freedom Party of Austria (FPÖ) and party free: 1

The mayor is the since 2015 directly elected Karl Dovjak (Social Democratic Party of Austria ).

=== Twin towns — sister cities ===
Keutschach is twinned with:

- Medea, Friuli-Venezia Giulia, Italy
