= Selig, wem Christus auf dem Weg begegnet =

Christian offertory hymn

- Christian hymn
- English: Blessed who is met by Christ on the way
- Written: 1978, revised 2011
- Text: by Bernardin Schellenberger
- Language: German
- Composed: 1681
- Published: 2013

"Selig, wem Christus auf dem Weg begegnet" (Blessed who is met by Christ on the way) is a Christian hymn with words in German by Bernardin Schellenberger written to match a 1681 Parisian melody. It appeared in the German hymnal Gotteslob.

== History ==
Bernardin Schellenberger, a theologian and writer, wrote the text of the hymn "Selig, wem Christus auf dem Weg begegnet" in 1978, inspired by the Second Vatican Council. When he wrote it, he was prior at Mariawald Abbey, a Trappist monastery. He was a Catholic priest who studied monastic theology in France, and theology in Salzburg and Freiburg. He revised the hymn in 2011 and it became part of the German Catholic hymnal Gotteslob as GL 275 in the section for Lent. It was then coupled with a 1681 melody from Paris. An alternate melody is from "Dank sei dir, Vater, für das ewge Leben". The song is also part of the Franciscan hymnal Sonnenmusikant.

== Text and theme ==
The text begins with praising people blessed who are met by Jesus on their way, similar to the Beatitudes. The hymn has been used for Lent, but covers more generally a believer's history with Jesus. Benedict of Nursia wrote in his monastic rules that believers should strive for a relationship to Jesus throughout life, not only during Lent.

In the first stanza, the believer is called to let everything go and carry the Cross ("Alles verlassen und sein Kreuz tragen"), like the disciples called by Jesus. In the second stanza, a believer is promised that Jesus will support during ways in the desert ("Bei ihm ist Christus, stärkt ihn in der Wüste"). The desert is a symbol for a difficult passage but also for a place to meet God. The third stanza reminds of the fact that Jesus reaches people by what his followers say, calling them to serve in this function. The fourth stanza is a paraphrase from the Lord's Prayer.
