= Monk of Salzburg =

German composer of the late 14th century

A page of music from the Monk of Salzburg's Ave Maria, from the Mondsee-Wiener Liederhandschrift of the mid-15th century.

The Monk of Salzburg (German: Mönch von Salzburg) was a German composer of the late 14th century. He worked at the court of the Salzburg archbishop Pilgrim von Puchheim (1365–96); more than 100 Liederhandschriften (manuscripts) in Early New High German are attributed to him.

His name and monastic order is unknown; some of the introductions to the manuscript sources mention the names Herman, Johans, and Hanns and describe him as either Benedictine or Dominican. Despite this confusion, all the manuscripts that contain his works "agree that he was a learned monk who wrote sacred and secular songs". His compositions overcome the Minnesang traditions and even approach recent polyphonic settings.

== List of songs, ordered by liturgical calendar ==
=== Advent ===
- Maria keusche muter zart
- Vor anegeng der sunne klar
- Joseph, lieber nefe mein
- Mein trost, Maria, raine mait
- Besniten wirdigkleichen
- Eia herre got, was mag das gesein

=== From the Sunday after Epiphany to Lent ===
- Ave, meres sterne
- Maria pis gegrüsset
- Des menschen liebhaber
- Do got in dem throne sas
- Maidleich pluem, der jungkfrawn kron
- Von unnser vrawen mitleiden

=== Easter season ===
- Die nacht wirt schir des himels gast
- Maria stuend mit swidem smerzen
- Eia der grossen liebe
- Kunig Christe, macher aller ding
- Heiligs kreuz, ein paum gar aine
- Schepher und weiser pist
- Sälig sei der selden zeit
- Aller werlde gelegenhait
- Sig und säld ist zu bedewten
- Christus erstuend mit siges van
- Grüest seist, heiliger tag
- Kum hochfeierliche zeit
- Kum senfter trost heiliger geist
- Kum her schepher heiliger geist
- Kum heiliger geist

=== Trinity Sunday to the end of the church year ===
- Herr, got allmechtig, drei person
- Git in drivaldikait ainvalt
- In gotes namen
- Ave, lebendes oblat
- Lobt all zungen des ernreichen
- Lob, o Sion, deinen hailer
- Das hell aufklimmen deiner diener stimmen
- Uns kunden all zwelf poten gar
- Muter guter sach die pest
- Wir süllen loben all die raine
- Magd hochgeporen
- Freu dich Sion, das augangen

=== Marian songs ===
- Ave, Balsams Creatur
- Pluom gezartet, ros an doren
- Richer schatz der höchsten freuden
- Ave, grüest pist, magtleich from
- Ich gruss dich gerne
- Salve grüest pist, mueter hailes
- Got grüeß dich, meuter unsers herren
- O Maria pia

=== Other songs ===
- Allmächtig got herr Jesu Christ
- Christe du bis liecht und der tag
- O du selige drifaltikait
