= Rauschelesee =

Lake

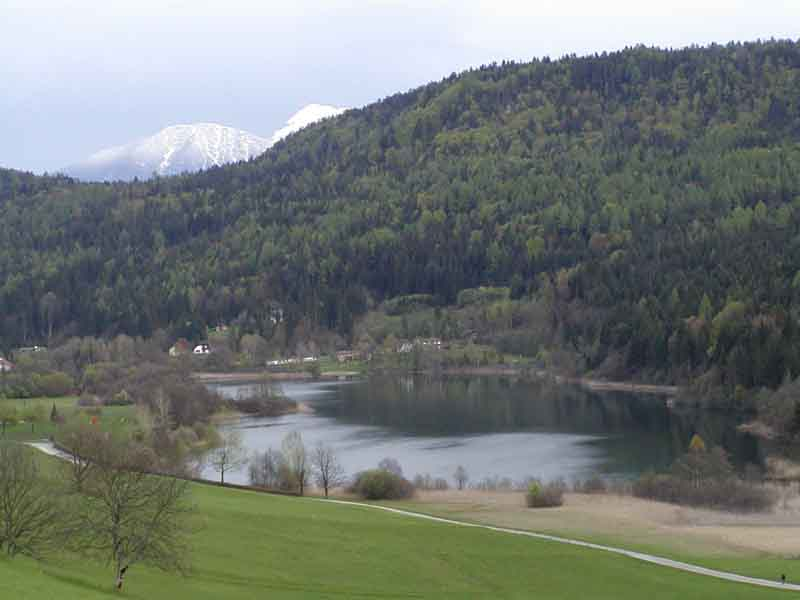
- Rauschelesee in spring

- Location within Kärnten
- Location: Keutschacher-See-Tal
- Coordinates: 46°35′5″N 14°13′17″E
- Primary inflows: Viktringerbach
- Primary outflows: Viktringerbach → Glanfurt
- Surface area: 0.191 km^{2} (0.074 sq mi)
- Max. depth: 12 m (39 ft)
- Water volume: 1,079,819 m^{3} (875.424 acre⋅ft)
- Surface elevation: 510 m (1,670 ft)

Rauschelesee is a lake in Keutschacher Seental near Lake Keutschach in the town Keutschach, Carinthia, Austria. The lake is used for fishing and swimming.
