= Pilgrim von Puchheim =

Prince-Archbishop of Salzburg

Pilgrim von Puchheim (c. 1330 – 5 April 1396) was the Prince-Archbishop of Salzburg (as Pilgrim II) from 1365 until his death. From 1393 onwards, he also was administrator of the Berchtesgaden Provostry. Pilgrim is known as a patron of literature and music with a "magnificent court". The Monk of Salzburg lived there for a time, if indeed they are not one and the same person.

A scion of the Austrian noble Lords of Puchheim, Pilgrim first appears as a canon of Salzburg Cathedral in 1353. He was ordained in Venice in 1354 before moving to Avignon, where he received his education. In 1363 he was appointed to a papal chaplaincy, the papacy being at the time seated at Avignon. He was appointed archbishop of Salzburg in 1365, backed by the Habsburg dukes of Austria against strong Bavarian resistance. Pilgrim nevertheless was able to free himself from ties and dependencies; he was so powerful that by 1393 he had endowed his cathedral more than one hundred times. In 1381 he obtained the privilegium de non evocando, confirming his status as a prince of the Holy Roman Empire.

The Monk of Salzburg claims in two of his songs that he wrote them at Pilgrim's command. In another piece, the lines form an acrostic that reads "Pylgreim Erczpischof Legat". In a secular song of 1387 Pilgrim's visit to the court of King Wenceslaus IV of Bohemia is mentioned, and his travels are also recounted in a secular song from 1392. The Monk also celebrated Pilgrim's chaplain, Richerus von Radstadt, in a song.

== Sources ==
- Classen, Albrecht (2008). The Poems of Oswald Von Wolkenstein: An English Translation of the Complete Works (1376/77–1445). Palgrave Macmillan.
- Frenzel, Peter (2001). "Mönch von Salzburg, Der (fl. 2d half of the 14th c.)". In Jeep, John M. (ed.). Medieval Germany: An Encyclopedia. Routledge. pp. 535–36.
- Spechtler, Franz Viktor (2007–13). "Monk of Salzburg". Grove Music Online. Oxford Music Online. Oxford University Press.
