= Bernardin Schellenberger =

German author and translator

- Born: Bernd Schellenberger; 13 February 1944 (age 82); Ellwangen, Germany
- Education: University of Salzburg; University of Freiburg
- Occupations: Catholic priest; Prior; Philosopher; Writer; Translator
- Organizations: Mariawald Abbey

Bernardin Schellenberger (born 11 February 1944) is a German Catholic theologian, priest and former Trappist. He has worked as a writer and translator, focused on spiritual topics and the monastic tradition.

== Life ==
Bernd Schellenberger was born in Ellwangen, and grew up in Stuttgart. He completed school in 1963 with the Abitur at the Friedrich-Eugens-Gymnasium. He then became a novice at the Franciscan Kloster Dietfurt, taking the monastic name Bernardin. He studied philosophy at the Hochschule der Bayerischen Franziskaner in Munich from 1964 to 1966, when he moved to Mariawald Abbey, a monastery of Trappists in Heimbach. Two years later, he studied monastic theology at the Abbaye du Mont-des-Cats. He continued theology studies at the University of Salzburg in 1969/70 and at the University of Freiburg from 1969 to 1972, graduating with the Diplom.

Schellenberger was ordained as a priest in 1972. In 1975, he became prior of Mariawald. He published books and translated from 1978, first translating Henri Nouwen's The Genesee Diary – Report from a Trappist Monastery. He translated more works by Nouwen, Richard Rohr and many other American, French and Irish authors, with topics such as Zen meditation, Jewish mysticism, Church history, dealing with illness, improving health, family affairs, enneagram and social criticism.

In 1981, Schellenberger and two other friars left Mariawald and tried a community in an empty parish house in Donzdorf, but failed. He lived in the Abbey of the Genesee in Genesee County, New York from 1982, returning to Donzdorf in 1983, where he lived as a freelance writer. Beginning in 1988, he has lived and worked at times in Togo, helping Africans. In 1991, he married a woman with two children, for whom he cared. They separated in 1998. He has lived in Bad Tölz from 2006.

== Publications ==
Works by Schellenberger are held by the German National Library, including:

=== Translator ===
- Gibran, Khalil; Schellenberger, Bernardin (2002). Wenn du liebst, dringst du ans Licht Lebensweisheiten (in German). Stuttgart: Kreuz. ISBN 978-3-7831-2105-6. OCLC 76347431.
- Jalāl al-Dīn Muḥammad Rūmī; Schellenberger, Bernardin (2003). Tanz meiner Seele mystische Texte (in German). Stuttgart: Kreuz. ISBN 978-3-7831-2218-3. OCLC 76472111.
- Gibran, Khalil; Macke, August; Schellenberger, Bernardin (2003). Das Lied in meinem Herzen (in German). Stuttgart: Kreuz. ISBN 978-3-7831-2228-2. OCLC 76472107.

=== Author ===
- Zwischen Rechberg und Staufen. Ottenbach und das Tal der Höfe (in German). Weissenhorn: Konrad. 2002. ISBN 3-87437-465-3. OCLC 51178574.
- Gehimmelt und geerdet. Atemlesungen für spirituell Suchende (in German). Würzburg: Echter. 2004. ISBN 978-3-429-02590-8. OCLC 76640419.
- Schellenberger, Bernardin (2005). Die Stille atmen. Leben als Zisterzienser (in German). Stuttgart. ISBN 978-3-7831-2605-1. OCLC 181458300.
- Achte auf dein Leben. Mit Benedikt Spiritualität erfahren (in German). Volkach: Verl. der Ideen. 2015. ISBN 978-3-942006-16-3. OCLC 910439824.
- Entdecke, dass du glücklich bist. Die Seligpreisungen der Bergpredigt (in German). Würzburg: Echter. 2006. ISBN 978-3-429-02764-3.
- Ich bin es, der mit dir redet. Die Botschaft des Johannesevangeliums (in German). Freiburg, Br: Herder. 2008. ISBN 978-3-451-32138-2. OCLC 315869013.
- So lebten unsere Vorfahren. Die Geschichte von Winzingen und Umgebung (in German). Vol. II. Weissenhorn: Konrad. 2010. pp. 736–1900. ISBN 978-3-87437-549-8. OCLC 688609194.
- Schellenberger, Bernardin (2014). Im Glanz des göttlichen Lichts. Orthodoxe Mystik: Geheimnis und Herausforderung (in German). München. ISBN 978-3-532-62465-4. OCLC 879874176.
- Benedikt von Nursia : Der Werdegang eines spirituellen Meisters - Inspiration für heute (in German). Würzburg: Echter. 2015. ISBN 978-3-429-03812-0. OCLC 904546378.
- Ein anderes Leben. Was ein Mönch erfährt (in German). Kevelaer. 2015. ISBN 978-3-8367-6011-9. OCLC 975001464.

=== Collaboration ===
- with Max Taucher: Krypten, Ursprung der Hoffnung. Echter, Würzburg 1985
- with Ines Baumgarth: Treppen, Stufen des Lebens. Echter, Würzburg 1989
- with Michael Albus: Glaubens A und O. Patmos, Düsseldorf 1995
- with Albus: Der Zauber des Alltäglichen. Kreuz, Stuttgart 2001
- with Albus: Worte aus der Wüste. Kreuz, Stuttgart 2003
- with Jürgen Hoeren (eds.): Feiertage einmal anders betrachtet. Gespräche mit Prof. K.-J. Kuschel über den Sinn von Weihnachten, Ostern und Pfingsten. Echter, Würzburg 2004
- with D. Weber, Fulbert Steffensky, Andrea Schwarz, Christoph Quarch and Hans-Joachim Höhn: Feuerwerke – Gebete am Himmel: Lebensfragen und Einsichten. (texts of a radio series of Hessischer Rundfunk 2004). Echter, Würzburg 2005
- with Wolfgang Buchmüller: Ein Lied, das froh im Herzen jubelt. Texte der spirituellen Erfahrung der frühen Zisterzienser. Be&Be, Heiligenkreuz im Wienerwald 2010

=== Hymn ===
Schellenberger wrote the text of the hymn "Selig, wem Christus auf dem Weg begegnet" (Blessed who is met by Christ on the way), which was included in the 2013 German Catholic hymnal Gotteslob, coupled with a 17th-century melody from Paris.
