= Paris Lodron =

Prince-Archbishop of the Prince-Archbishopric of Salzburg

Paris von Lodron
- Prince-Archbishop of Salzburg
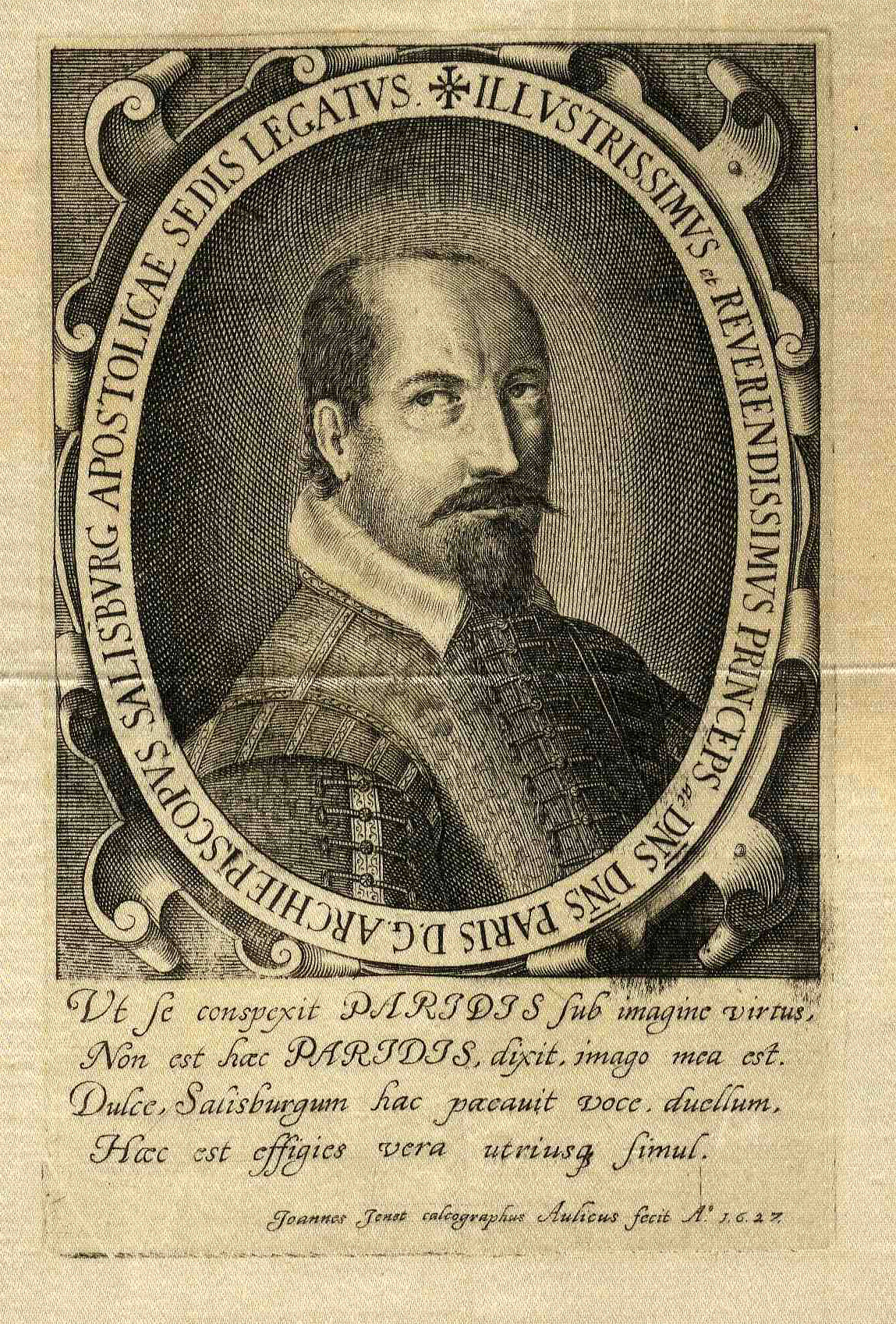
- Paris Lodron, 1627
- Native name: Paride Lodron
- Church: Catholic Church
- Archdiocese: Archdiocese of Salzburg
- In office: 3 March 1619 – 15 December 1653
- Predecessor: Markus Sittich von Hohenems
- Successor: Guidobald of Thun

Orders
- Ordination: March 1614
- Consecration: 23 May 1619 by Albert von Toerring-Stein

Personal details
- Born: 13 February 1586 Castelnuovo di Noarna (in Nogaredo), Princely County of Tyrol, Austrian Circle, Holy Roman Empire
- Died: 15 December 1653 (aged 67) Salzburg, Prince-Archbishopric of Salzburg, Bavarian Circle, Holy Roman Empire
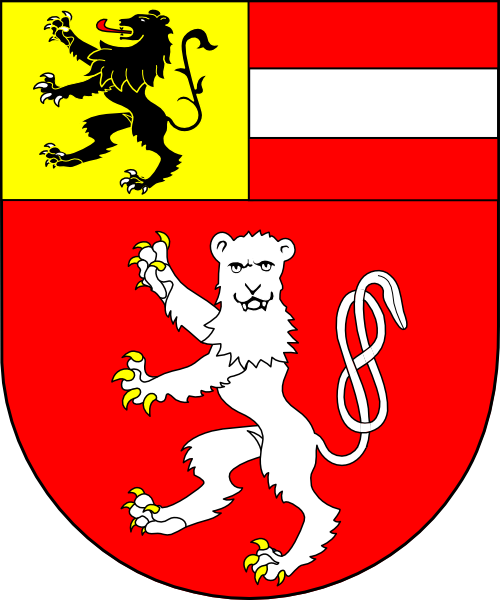
- Coat of arms: Paris von Lodron's coat of arms

Paris Lodron or Paris of Lodron (German: Paris Graf von Lodron), 13 February 1586 – 15 December 1653, was the Prince-Archbishop of the Prince-Archbishopric of Salzburg from 1619–1653.

== Early life ==
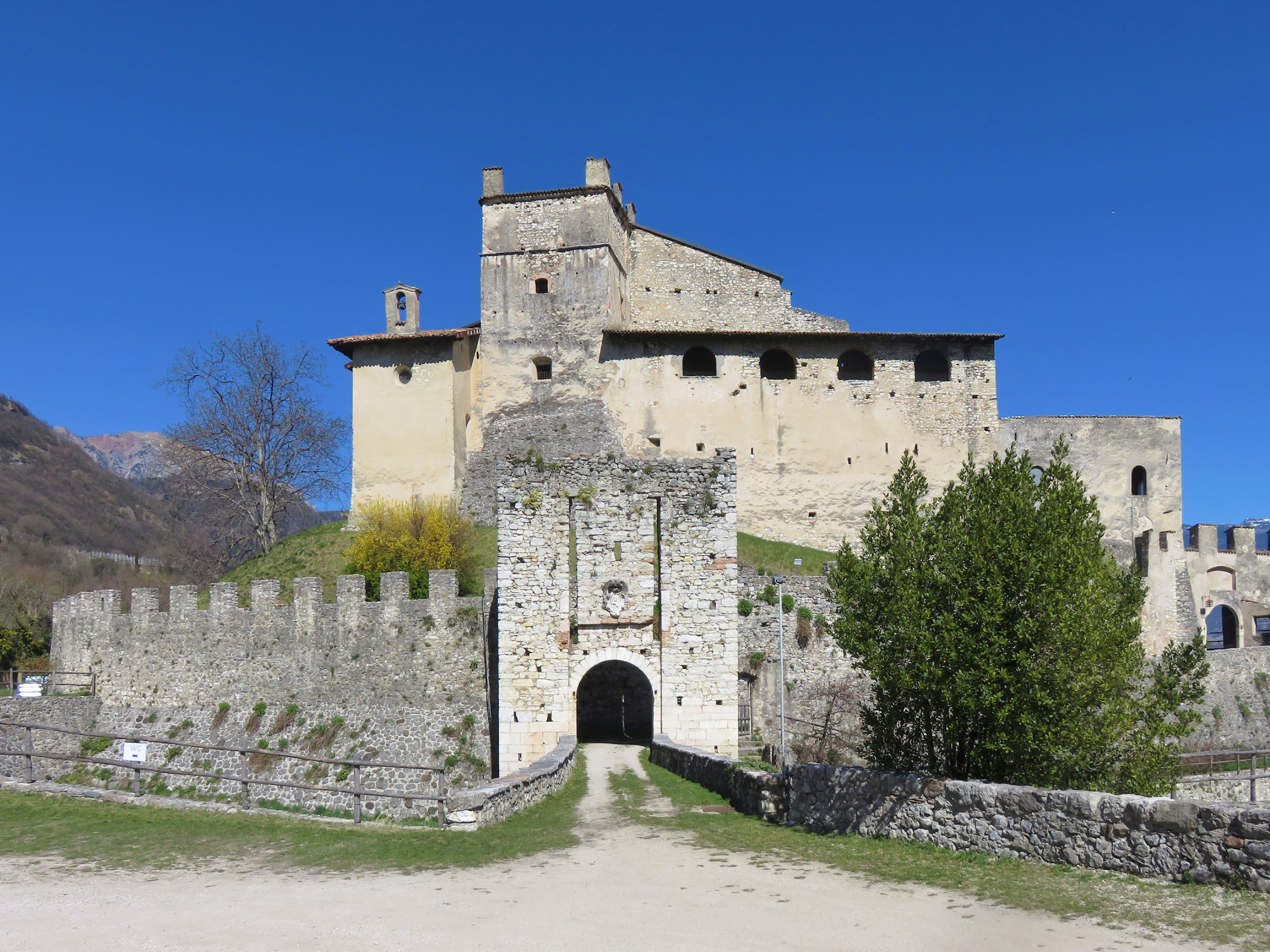
Castelnuovo de Noarna

He was born 13 February 1586 in the Castelnuovo di Noarna, in Nogaredo, Trentino. He was the son of Count Nicolò Lodron (1549–1621) (a scion of the branch of the noble Italian family Lodron from Trentino called the Vallagarina or Castelnuovo-Castellano line), an imperial colonel and governor of the County of Tyrol; and his wife Dorothea von Welsperg (1559–1615).

At the age of eleven Lodron went to Trento to study theology, and later to Bologna, completing his studies with the Jesuits in Ingolstadt in 1604. He was ordained a priest in March 1614. At the request of Prince-Archbishop Markus Sittich von Hohenems, Lodron was elected Provost of the cathedral chapter and President of the Archbishop's exchequer.

== Archbishop ==
Sittich died 9 Oct 1619, and Lodron was elected to succeed him on 13 November 1619. He received his episcopal ordination on 23 May of the following year.

Due to Sittich's refusal to join the Catholic League, Lodron was able to keep Salzburg out of the Thirty Years' War and concentrate on improvements to his domain.

On 23 July 1622, he appointed the scholar Albert Keuslin first rector of the Benedictine University of Salzburg. Keuslin, a graduate of the Jesuit University of Dillingen, had established the Akademisches Gymnasium, a secondary school, at Salzburg five years earlier. By resolution of Emperor Ferdinand II, issued on 8 October, the Gymnasium was raised to a university. While the Thirty Years' War raged outside the Archbishopric, the university was built up and maintained by a federation of Benedictine abbeys from Salzburg, Switzerland, Bavaria and Austria. In its early years, courses taught were theology, divinity, philosophy, law, and medicine. The university is sometimes called Paris-Lodron-Universität-Salzburg (PLUS) after the Archbishop.

Paris Lodron had modern bastion fort (trace italienne) fortifications built for the town and country by master builder Santino Solari. In the city, a defensive belt of five large bastions was drawn around the Neustadt, which stretched from the Linzertoren over the Franz-Josef-Straße area to the former Mirabell Gate and the spa garden. In the old town, the rocks of the Mönchsberg were carved out all around (leveled and smoothed) and thus made usable as natural defensive walls. The Müllner Schanze formed the end of the old town on the left bank in the north. The Hohensalzburg Fortress was also considerably expanded in line with the new defense technology, and the outworks in particular (Nonnbergbasteien, Hasengrabenbastei, Katzen) were reinforced.

Despite the military and political problems of his time, Lodron was able to complete the Salzburg Cathedral renovations begun but not finished by Sittich, and have it artistically decorated. The consecration of the cathedral on 25 September 1628 was an eight-day baroque festival. Three collegiate monasteries were founded by Lodron, in 1618 and 1621 in Laufen, in 1633 in Tittmoning and in 1631 the Schneherrrenstift near Salzburg Cathedral.

== Death and succession ==
Lodron died in Salzburg on 15 December 1653, and would be succeeded as Archbishop by Guidobald von Thun und Hohenstein.

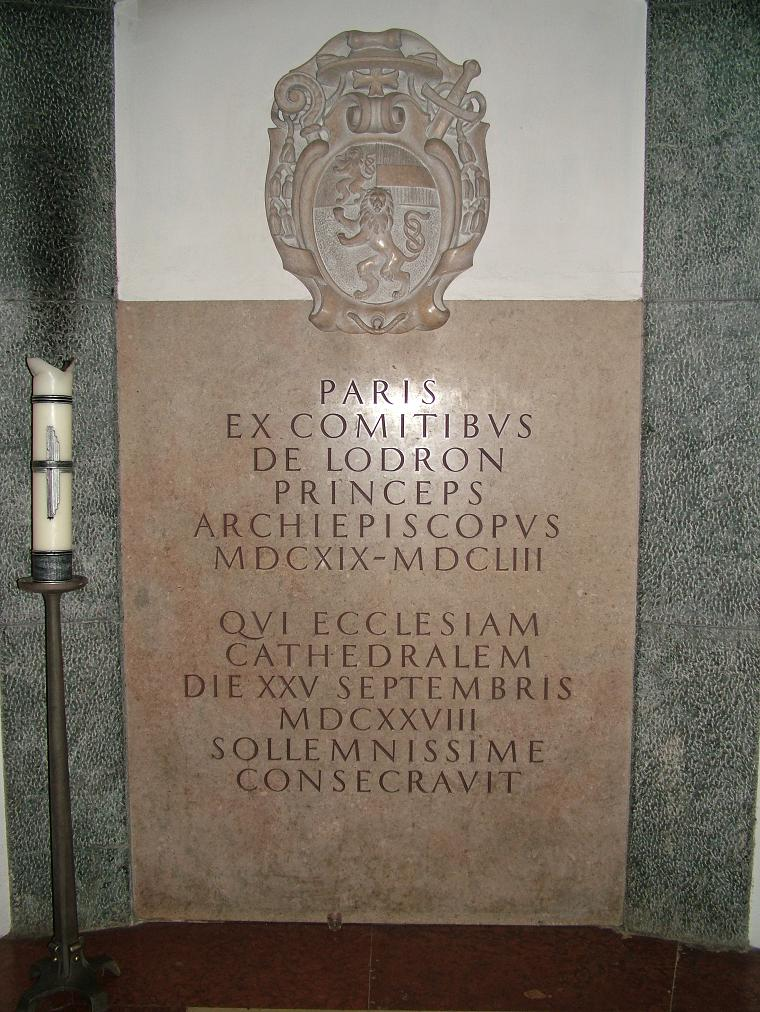
Sepulcher of Paris of Londron in Salzburg Cathedral

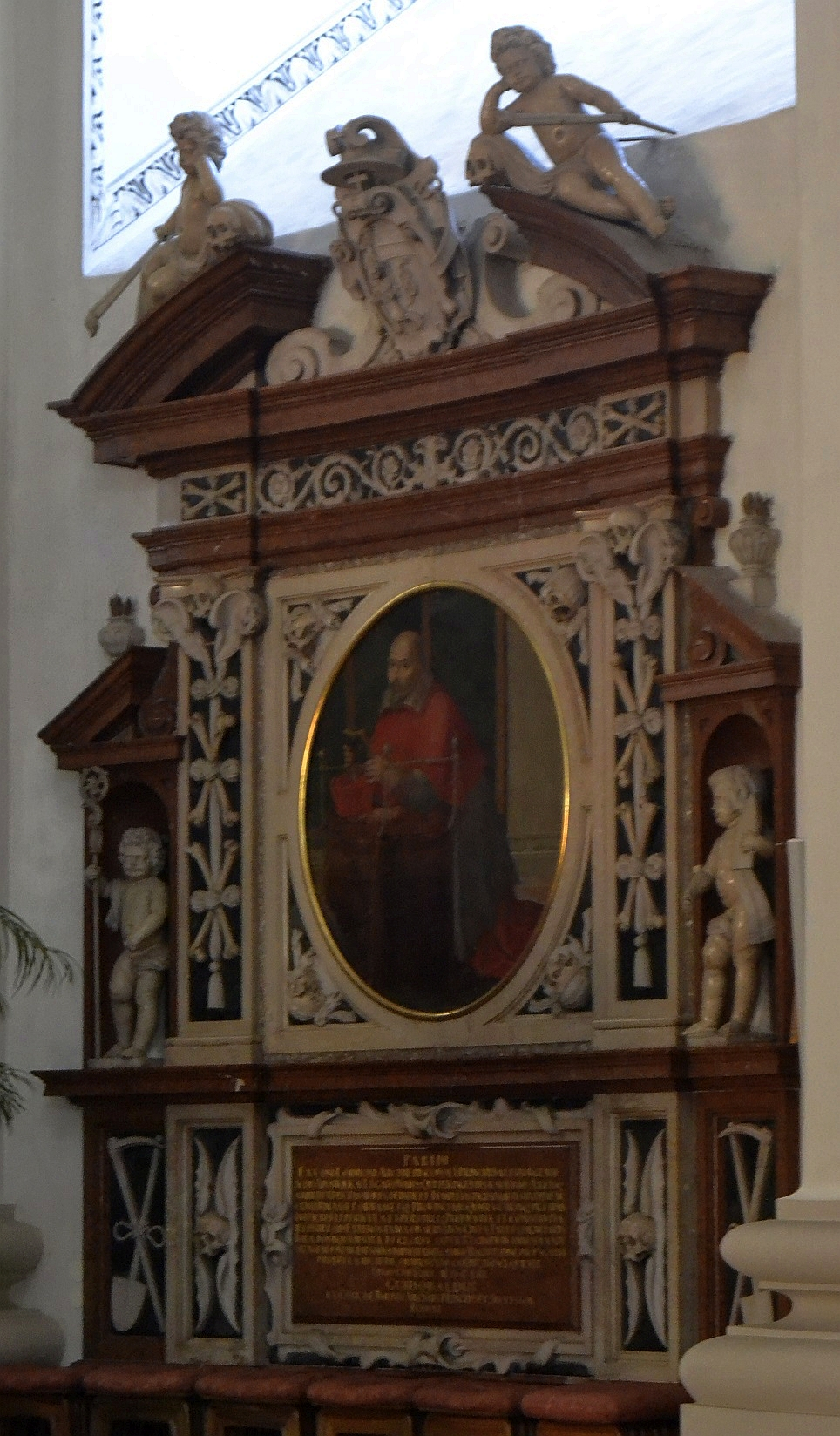
Cenotaph of Paris of Lodron in Salzburg Cathedral

Lodron did not keep a mistress as his predecessors sometimes had, but he provided lavishly for the first and second sons of his brother Christoph, building a pair of chateaus (the Paris Lodronsche Primogeniturpalast and Paris-Lodronscher Sekundogeniturpalast) in the core of Salzburg, which were still standing in the 21st century.

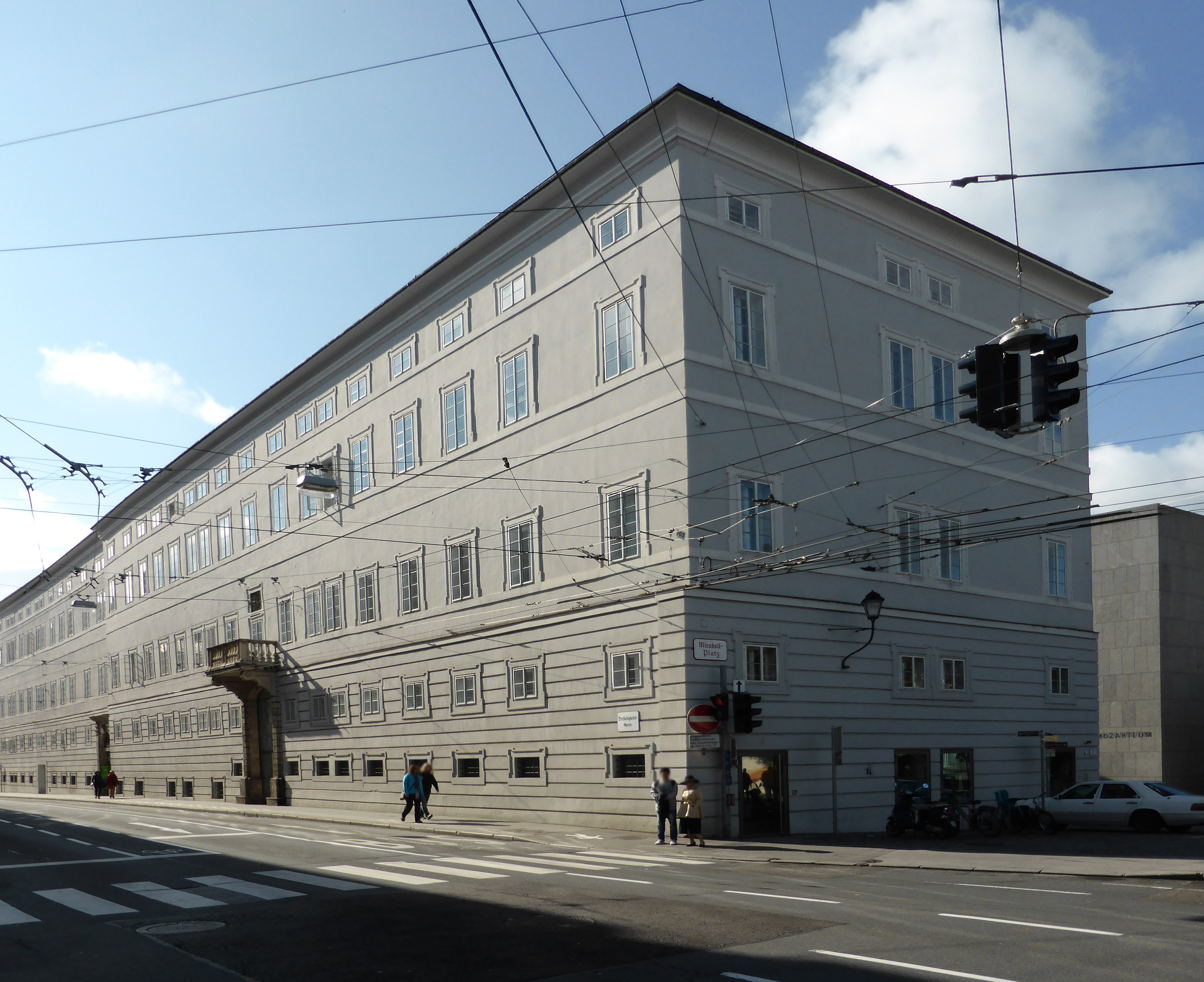
The Primogeniturpalast

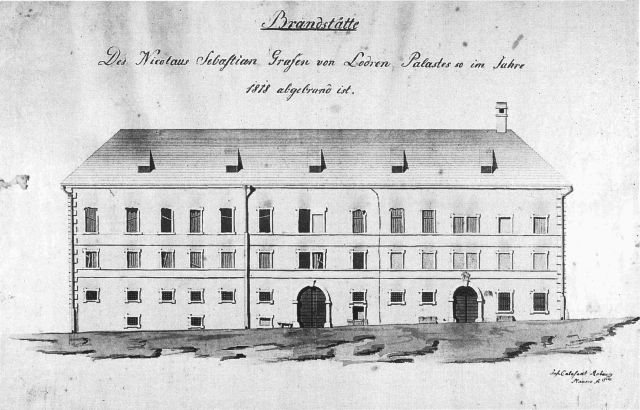
The Sekundogeniturpalast

The four-block Paris-Lodron-Straße, near Mirabell Palace, still serves as a border between the city's Altstadt and Neustadt.

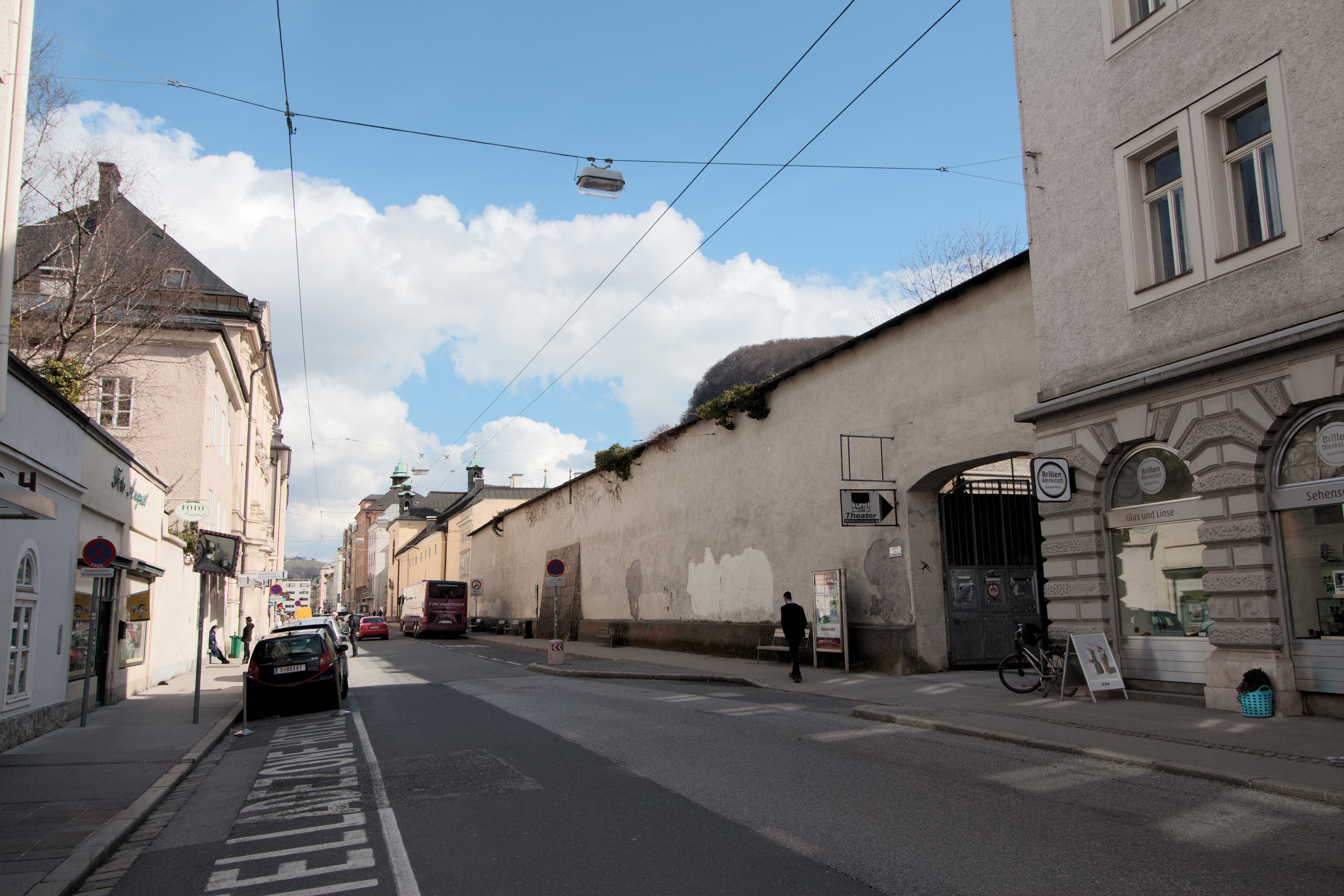
Paris-Lodron-Straße
