= Max Gandolph von Kuenburg =

- Prince-Archbishop of Salzburg
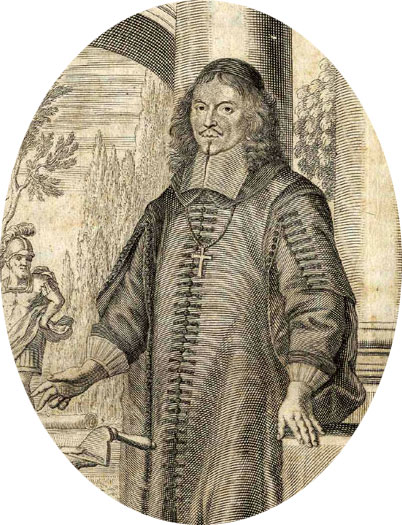
- Church: Catholic Church
- Archdiocese: Archdiocese of Salzburg
- In office: 12 November 1668 – 3 May 1687
- Predecessor: Guidobald of Thun
- Successor: Johann Ernst von Thun und Hohenstein
- Previous posts: Bishop of Seckau (1665-1668); Bishop of Lavant (1654-1665)

Orders
- Ordination: 1648
- Consecration: 1 August 1655 by Guidobald of Thun
- Created cardinal: 2 September 1686 by Pope Innocent XI

Personal details
- Born: Maximilian Gandolf Graf von Kuenburg; 2 October 1622 Graz, Duchy of Styria, Austrian Circle, Holy Roman Empire
- Died: 3 May 1687 (aged 64)

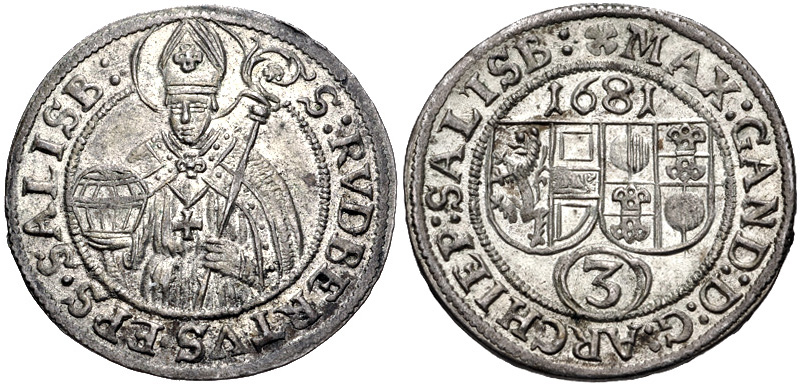
Silver kreuzer of Max Gandolph von Küenburg, dated 1681

Max Gandolph von Kuenburg (October 30, 1622 – May 3, 1687; his name is also spelled Gandolf or Gandalf; until 1665 Baron of Kuenburg) was Prince-Archbishop of Salzburg from 1668 to 1687.

== His life ==
He was born in Graz. In his youth, he studied with Jesuits in that city and later at the Collegium Germanicum in Rome, which was also run by the Society of Jesus. In 1648 he was ordained a priest for Salzburg, and in 1654 Bishop of Lavant. On July 30, 1668, he was elected Archbishop of Salzburg and received the pallium on December 8 of the same year, the feast day of the Immaculately Conceived Virgin Mary; on the same feast day, he was appointed Bishop of Lavant, a suffragan bishopric of Salzburg. On September 2, 1686, he was elevated to cardinal by Pope Innocent XI; less than a year later, the chief shepherd of Salzburg died.

Gandolf initiated various measures in the spirit of the Counter-Reformation: he founded the Seekirchen Abbey (1679), had the original pilgrimage church in Maria Plain built, established the court library, founded the Augustinian monastery in Hallein, and initiated the All Saints' Church in Tittmoning as well as the Theatine monastery in Salzburg. He also had the Church of St. Erhard and the Kajetanerkirche built in the city.

== His term as archbishop ==
=== Expulsion of Protestants ===
He carried out the expulsion of the Protestant Dürrnberg miners under their leader Joseph Schaitberger, as well as the Deferegg and Dürrnberg exiles; it was part of a larger initiative called the Expulsion of Salzburg Protestants.

=== Persecution of "witches" ===
In the years between 1675 and 1690, Max Gandolph von Kuenburg had 153 people executed for alleged sorcery and witchcraft in the archdiocese, the majority of them children and young people. With this procedure, he also wanted to combat "begging". The defendants were almost all beggars, vagrants or destitute. Confessions were extorted through torture. The trial against Barbara Koller and her son Jakob Koller, known as Schinderjackl, took center stage. The "sorcerer Jackl" was accused of gathering young people around him in a "blood community". In the city of Salzburg, the accused beggar boys were also held in the witches' tower in Salzburg due to the overcrowding of the prisons in 1678-1679. Felix Mitterer portrays the trials in his drama The Devil's Children.

=== Patron of theatre and art ===
Theatre and music were highly popular at Max Gandolph's court. Festivals for visiting aristocrats were frequent, often lasting for several days.

== Death ==
Archbishop Kuenburg died on May 3, 1687. His remains were buried in a pewter coffin in the crypt of Salzburg Cathedral, while his heart and entrails were taken to the Maria Plain basilica. The funeral music was composed by Heinrich Ignaz Franz Biber. The epitaph contains the play on the Latin words "Amore, More, Ore, Re", suggesting that he was a friend who served in love, morals, word and deed.

== Sources ==
- O'Reilly, William (2015). "Emigration from the Habsburg Monarchy and Salzburg to the New World, 1700-1848". In Coffman, D'Maris; Leonard, Adrian; O'Reilly, William (eds.). The Atlantic World. Routledge. ISBN 978-1317576051.
- Eisen, Cliff (1989). "Salzburg under Church Rule". In Zaslaw, Neal (ed.). The Classical Era: Volume 5: From the 1740s to the end of the 18th Century. Palgrave Macmillan. ISBN 978-0333526460.

Religious titles
Preceded by Guidobald of Thun	Archbishop of Salzburg; 1668 –1687	Succeeded by Johann Ernst von Thun und Hohenstein
