= Keutschacher See =

Keutschacher See Lake Keutschach
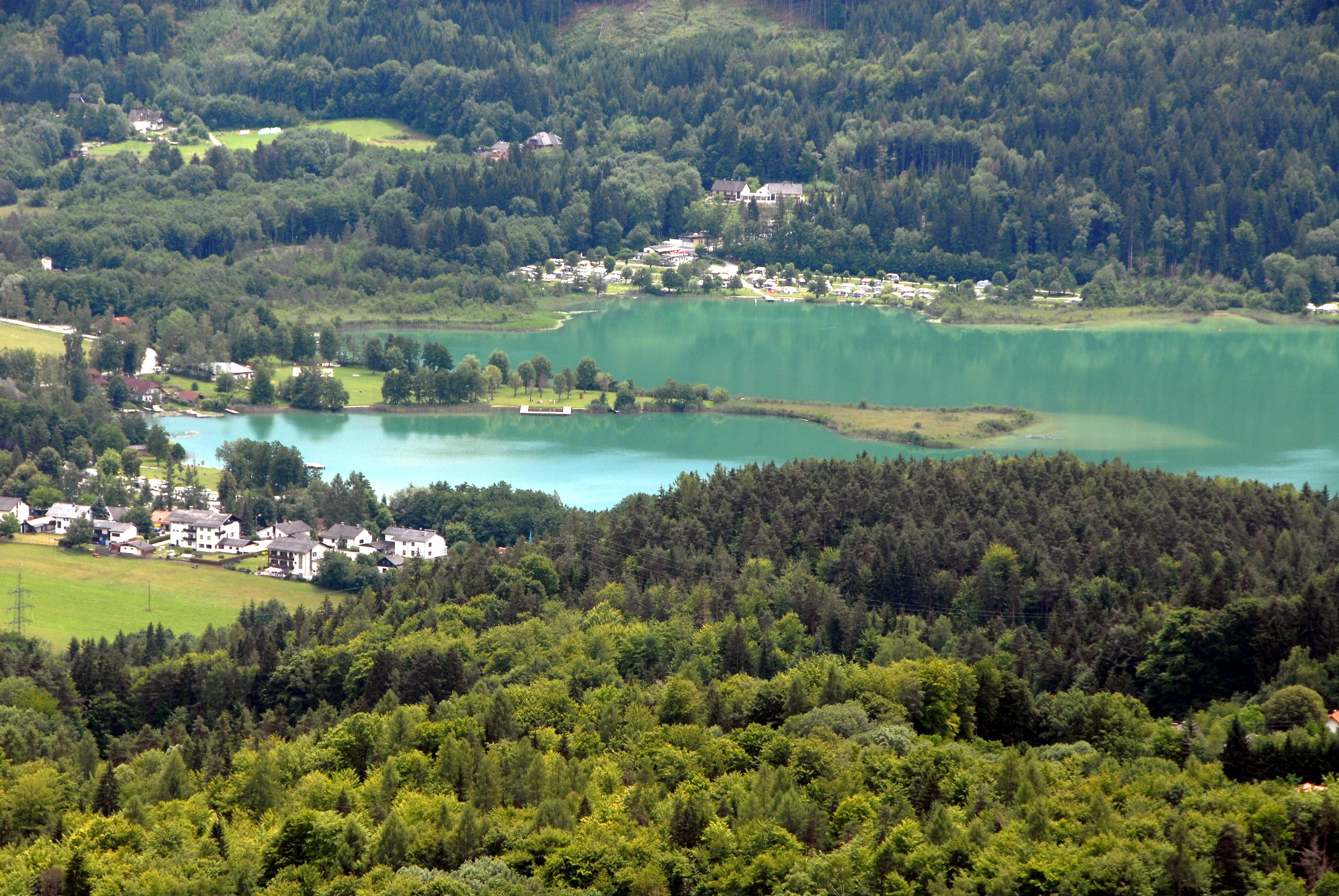
- Eastern shore

- Location within Austria
- Location: Carinthia
- Coordinates: 46°35′10″N 14°9′40″E
- Type: glacial lake
- Primary inflows: Rakouzabach, Weißenbach
- Primary outflows: Reifnitzbach to Wörthersee
- Catchment area: 29.81 km^{2} (11.51 sq mi)
- Basin countries: Austria
- Max. length: 2 km (1.2 mi)
- Max. width: 1.1 km (0.68 mi)
- Surface area: 1.327 km^{2} (0.512 sq mi)
- Average depth: 10.3 m (34 ft)
- Max. depth: 15.6 m (51 ft)
- Water volume: 13,600,000 m^{3} (11,000 acre⋅ft)
- Residence time: 0.75 years
- Surface elevation: 506 m (1,660 ft)
- Settlements: Keutschach am See

UNESCO World Heritage Site
- Part of: Prehistoric pile dwellings around the Alps
- Criteria: Cultural: (iv), (v)
- Reference: 1363-057
- Inscription: 2011 (35th Session)
- Area: 0.21 ha (0.52 acres)
- Buffer zone: 132.5 ha (327 acres)

Keutschacher See (Slovene: Hodiško jezero, English: Lake Keutschach) is a lake of Carinthia, Austria. It is sixth-largest in Carinthia, with an area of 1.32 km^{2} (0.51 sq mi). It has a Neolithic stilt settlement, discovered by Ferdinand von Hochstetter in 1864.

== Geography ==
The lake is located in an eponymous basin, formed by a tributary of the Draugletscher that is itself tracing out a tectonic fault. The lake was much larger in the past than it is today, as evidenced by the extensive marshland to the east and north of the lake.

The lake has an oblong-oval shape. To the west lies a bay, into which the tributaries flow. To the east is a narrow peninsula, which extends about 400 m (440 yd) into the lake. In the middle of the lake there is a shoal where the water is only 1.6 m (5.2 ft) deep, but nearby the lake reaches its maximum depth of 15.6 m (51 ft). The peninsula and the shoals are part of rock ridges that sweep under the lake bottom in a southwest-northeast direction.

The western shore of the lake has extensive silt deposits, part of a sandy moor covered with sedge and reeds that extends to the Hafnersee. There is also a small pond, the "Moorteich."

The catchment area of the lake covers 28.4 km^{2} (11.0 sq mi). Of these, around 54% is forested, 30% agricultural land, 6% waters, and the remainder is developed into settlements or recreational areas.

== Usage ==
With the exception of the northern shore, most parts of the lake and its catchment area are located in the Keutschacher Lake Valley nature reserve. However, the lake itself and the associated fishery are privately managed, and the lake is a popular site for bathing and fishing.

On the south bank there are two nudist campsites with capacity for up to 3,000 guests.

== Stilt dwellings ==
The shallows of the lake contain a pile dwelling from about 6000 years ago that appears to have been occupied for about 300 years. It is one of the oldest of four pole periods in Central Europe. At that time, the water level of the lake may have been around 1.5 m lower than it is today, so that village would have been located on an island.

The settlement includes two types of houses: log cabins with mud walls and half-timbered houses made of wickerwork. The woods used to construct the structures vary widely. Dendrochronology suggests that two oak trunks used in the construction date to 3947 and 3871 BC. Radiometric data from other finds gives values ranging between 4340 and 3780 BC.

The clay pottery found in the settlement is of Lasinja-Kanzianiberg type, common to Danubian Copper Age settlements. There is evidence of copper smelting, but the evidence has yet to be satisfactorily dated.

Animal bones found among the food remains suggest that the inhabitants' meat came primarily from game hunting; 59% are from the red deer. Cattle bones also comprise a significant extent of the findings (13%).
