= Guidobald of Thun =

Archbishop of Salzburg and Cardinal

- Cardinal, Archbishop of Salzburg
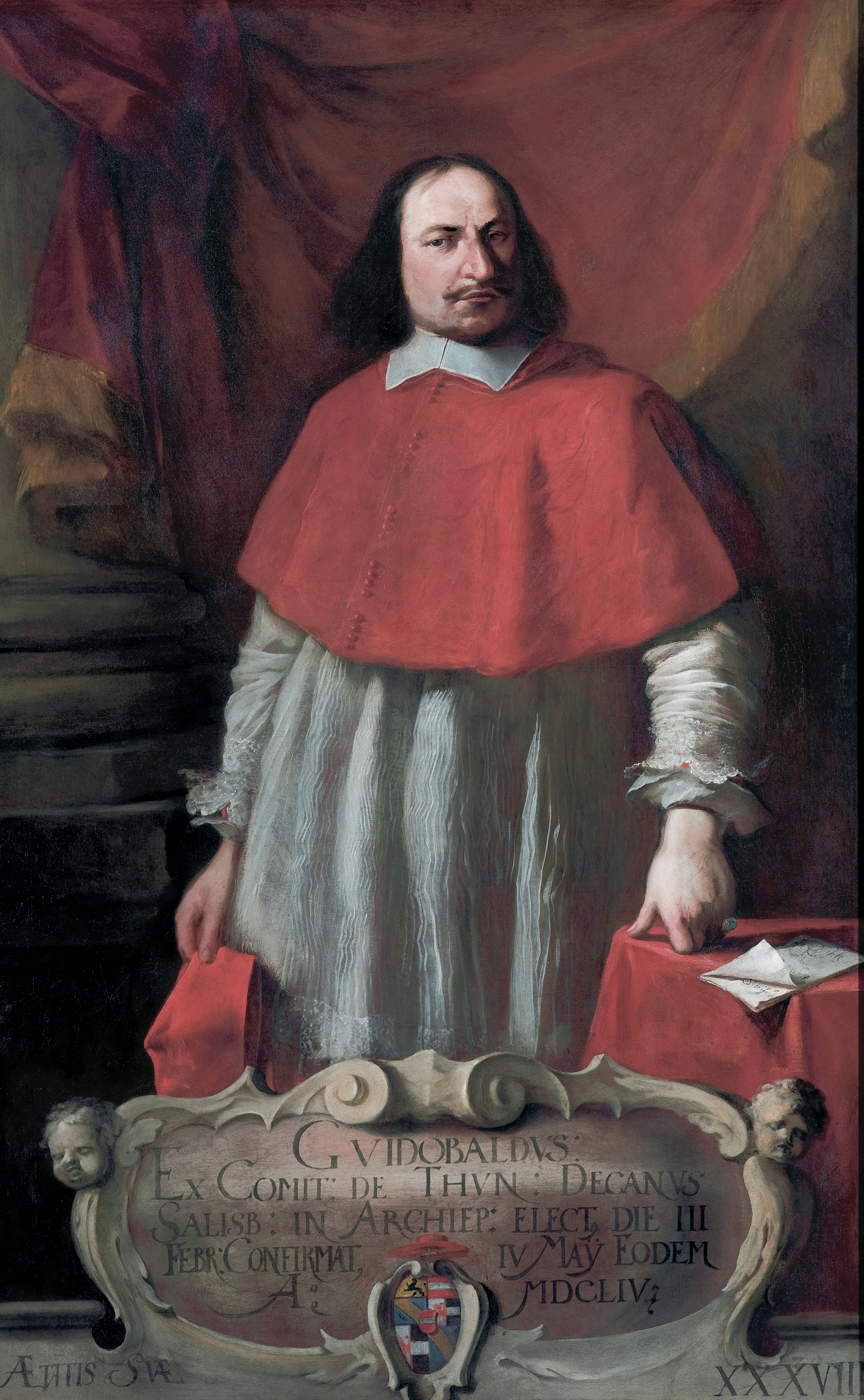
- Guidobald in 1654
- Native name: Guidobald von Thun und Hohenstein
- Church: Roman Catholic
- Archdiocese: Salzburg
- In office: 1654–1668

Orders
- Ordination: 24 September 1654 by Cardinal Ernst Adalbert von Harrach
- Created cardinal: 7 March 1667 by Pope Alexander VII

Personal details
- Born: 16 December 1616 Castelfondo, Tyrol
- Died: 1 June 1668 (aged 51) Salzburg
- Buried: Salzburg Cathedral
- Parents: Johann Siegmund von Thun

Guidobald of Thun (1616–1668) was a Roman Catholic Archbishop of Salzburg, Bishop of Regensburg, and a Cardinal.

== Life ==
Born on 16 December 1616, into the House of Thun, Guidobald of Thun was chosen as the Archbishop of Salzburg on 3 February 1654. He officially assumed the title of Archbishop of Salzburg on 24 September 1654, following his ordination by Cardinal Ernst Adalbert von Harrach.

Guidobald is best known for overseeing the completion of the towers, facade, and domes of Salzburg Cathedral during his time as bishop. He also commissioned the construction of Winterreitschule and the Spring on "Residenzplatz". In addition, he established a medical branch at the University of Salzburg.

On 7 March 1666 Guidobald was appointed as the Bishop of Regensburg, and exactly one year later, on 7 March 1667, he was elevated to the rank of Cardinal by Pope Alexander VII. Guidobald was officially confirmed as the Bishop of Regensburg on 16 March 1667.

== Death ==
On 8 May 1668 Guidobald fell through a loose board on a bridge in Hellbrunn, injuring his shin. The injury became infected, leading to blood poisoning. Shortly after, on 1 June 1668, Archbishop Guidobald died. He was buried in the crypt of Salzburg Cathedral.

== Gallery ==
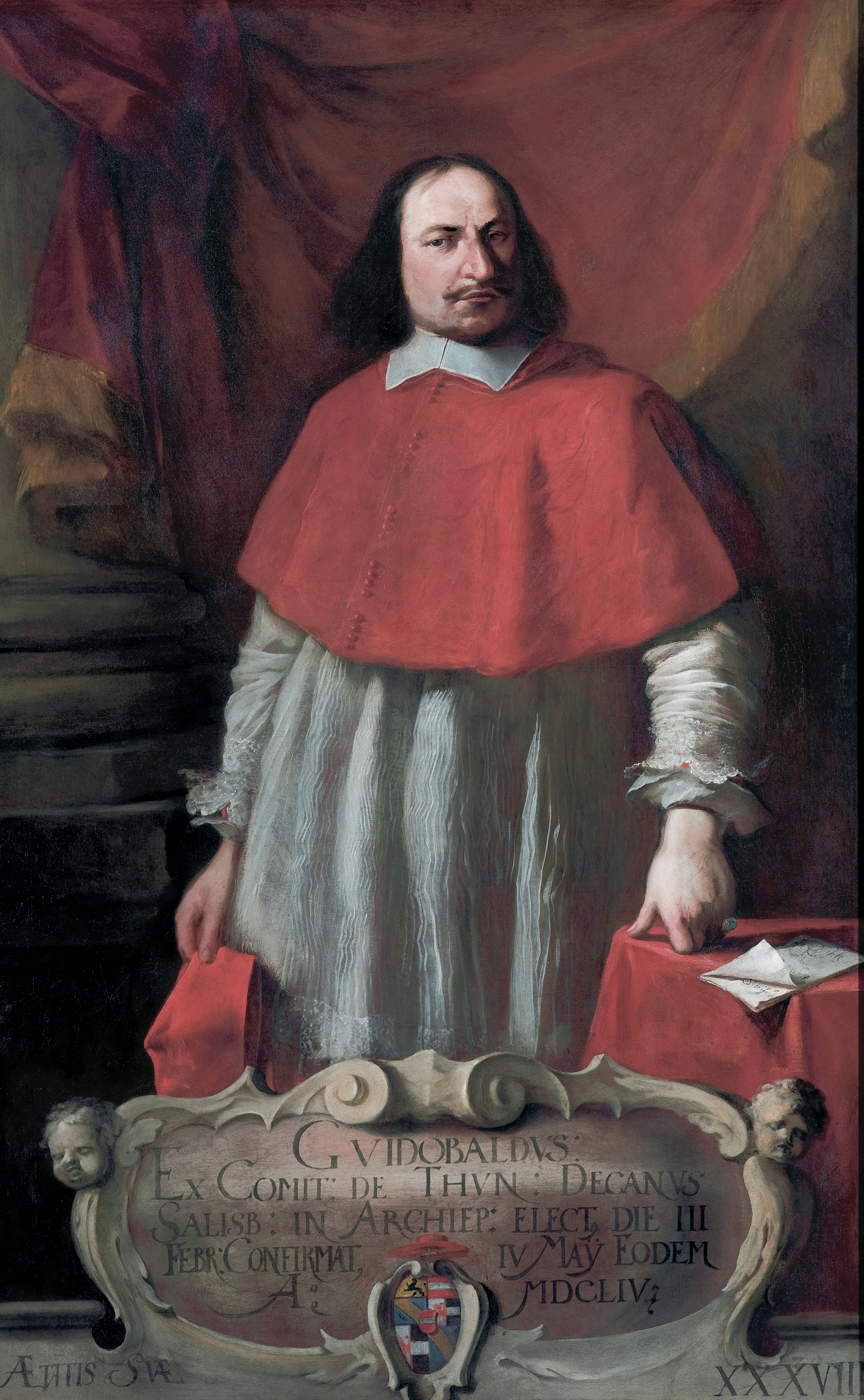
Guidobald in 1654

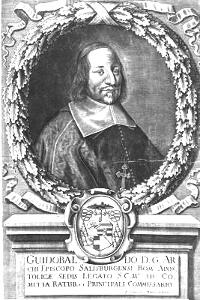
Guidobald in 1667

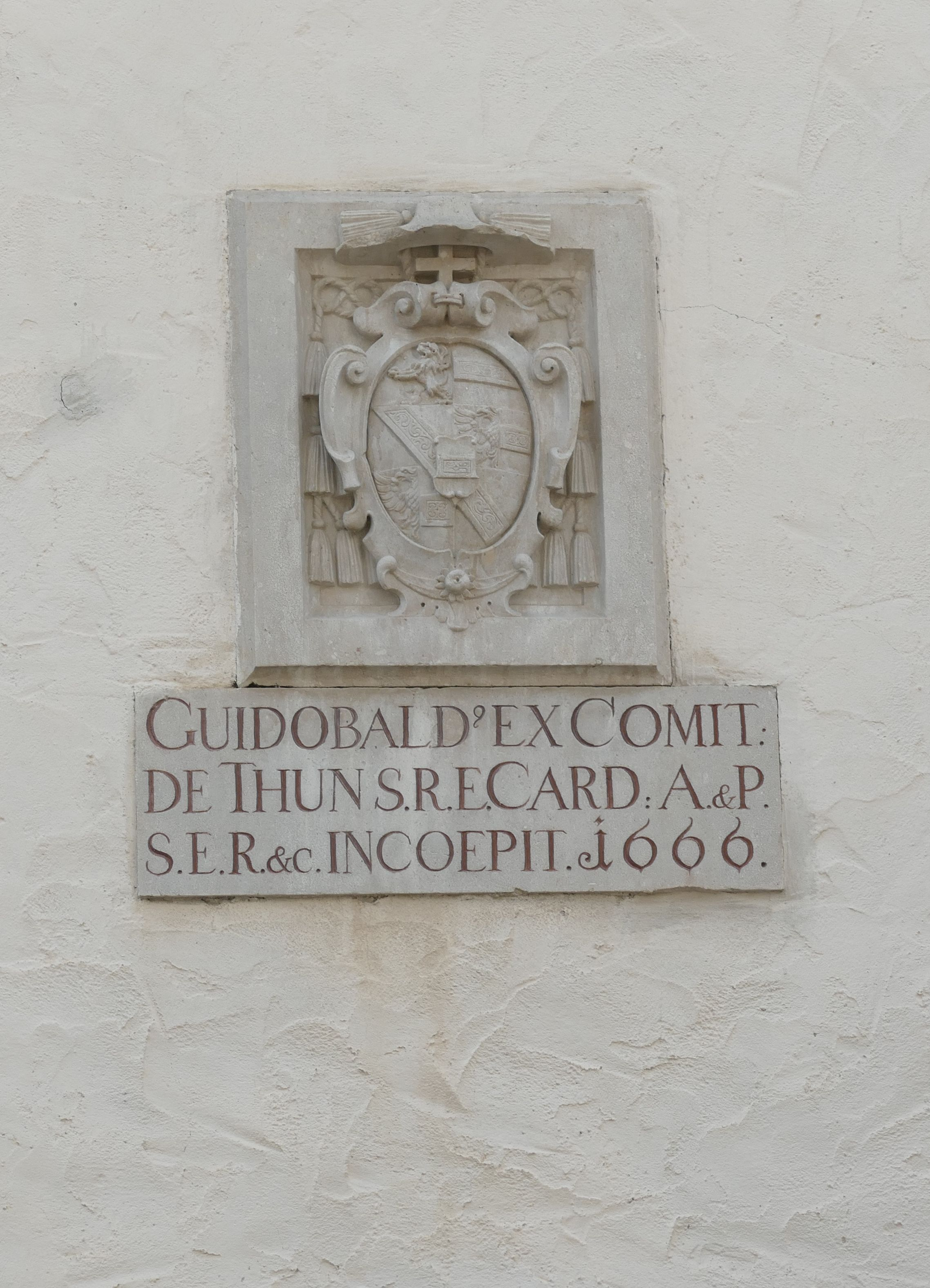
Coat of Arms of Guidobald

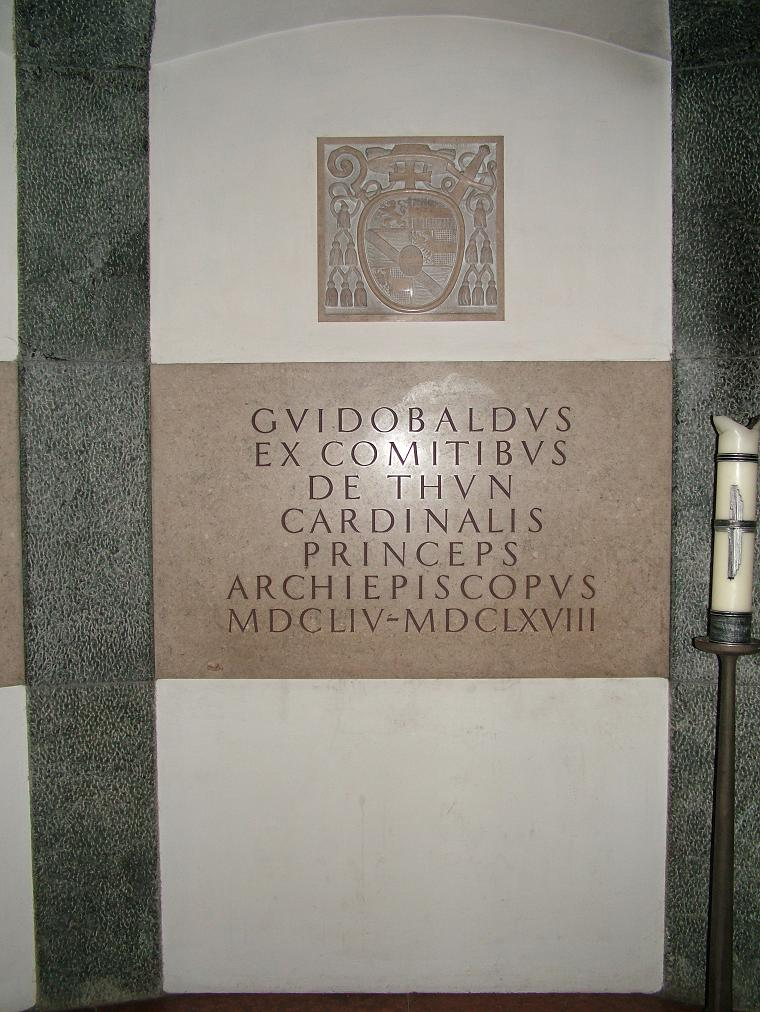
Tomb of Guidobald

Catholic Church titles
Preceded by Paris von Lodron	Archbishop of Salzburg; 1654–1668	Succeeded by Max Gandolph von Kuenburg
Preceded by Adam Lorenz von Törring	Bishop of Regensburg; 1667-1668	Succeeded by Albrecht Sigismund von Bayern
