= Baßgeigensee =

- Location within Austria
- Location: Carinthia, Austria
- Coordinates: 46.5872°N 14.2023°E
- Type: lake

Baßgeigensee is a lake of Carinthia, Austria.
