= Hafnersee =

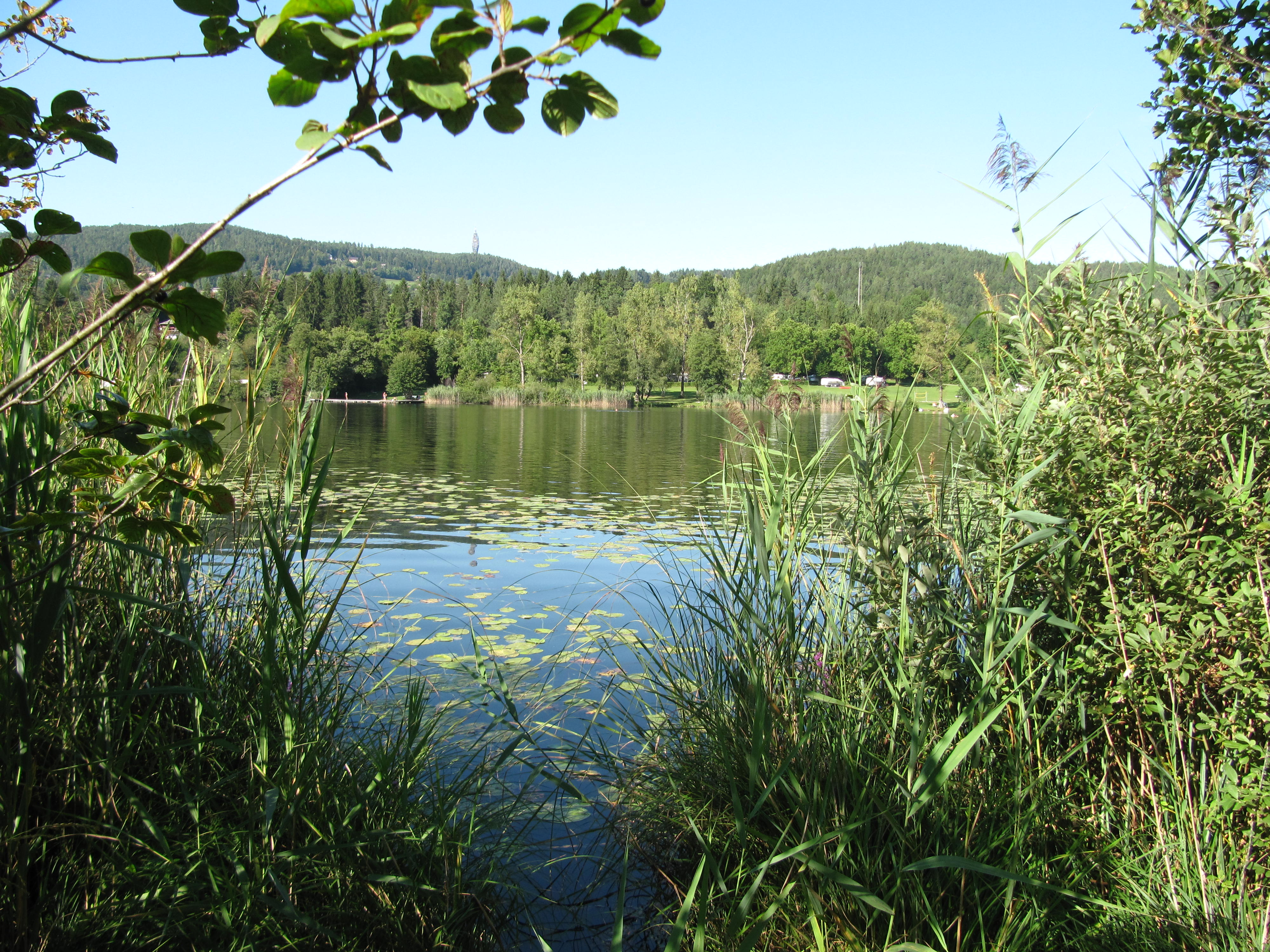

- Location within Austria
- Location: Keutschach am See municipality, Carinthia, Austria
- Coordinates: 46°35′N 14°08′E
- Type: lake
- Islands: 0
- Settlements: Plescherken

Hafnersee is a small natural lake (0.159397 km²) of Carinthia, Austria.

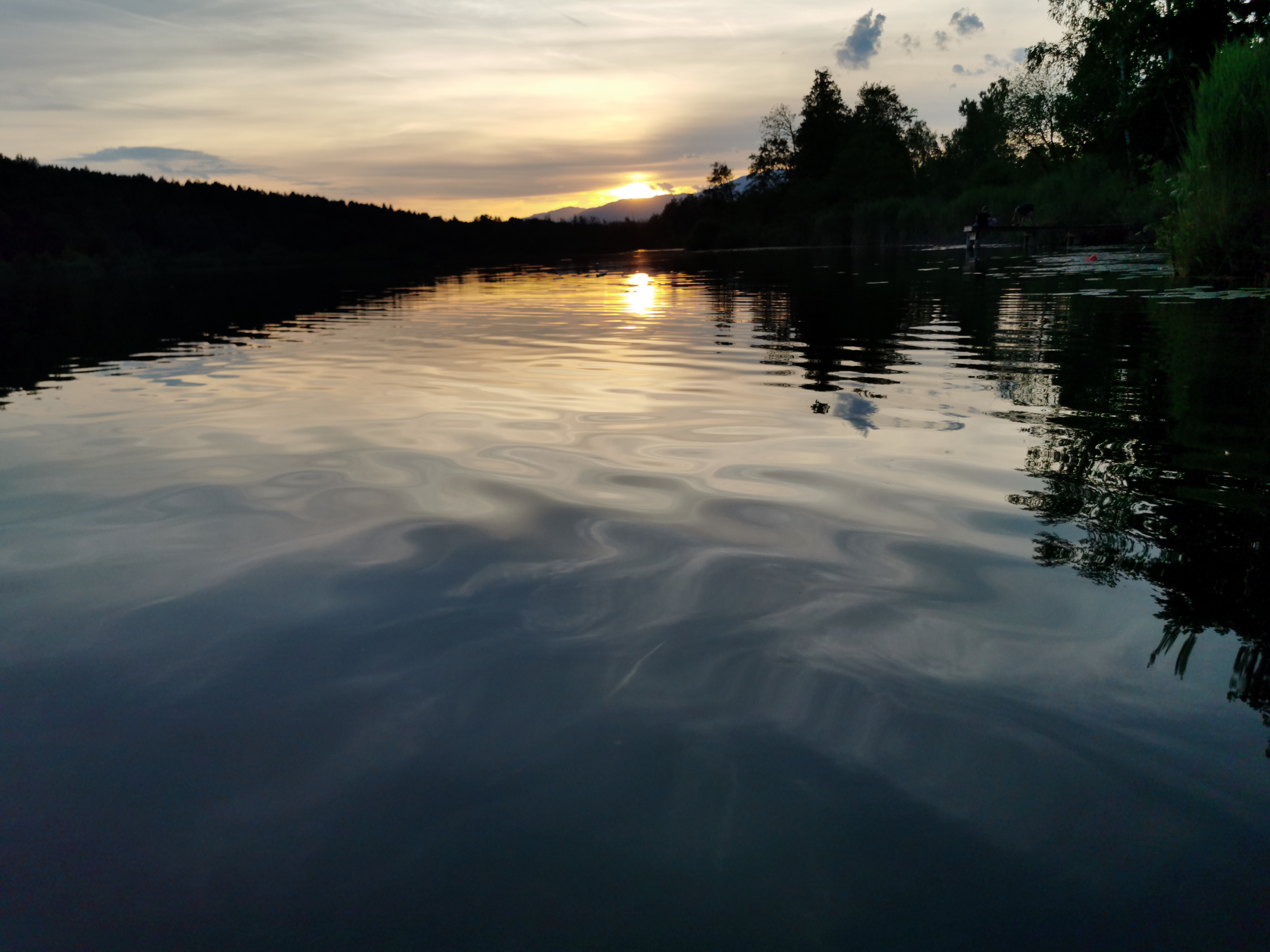
sunset
