= Prince-Archbishopric of Salzburg =

Ecclesiastic principality in the Holy Roman Empire

Prince-Archbishopric of Salzburg Archiepiscopatus Salisburgensis (Latin) Fürsterzbistum Salzburg (German)
- 1328–1803
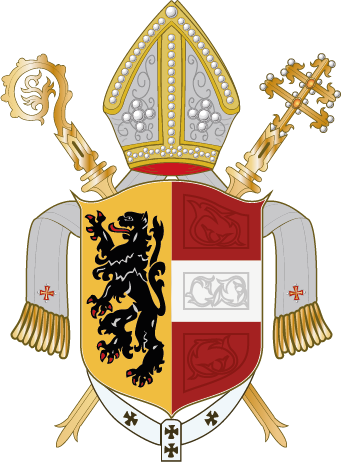
- Coat of arms

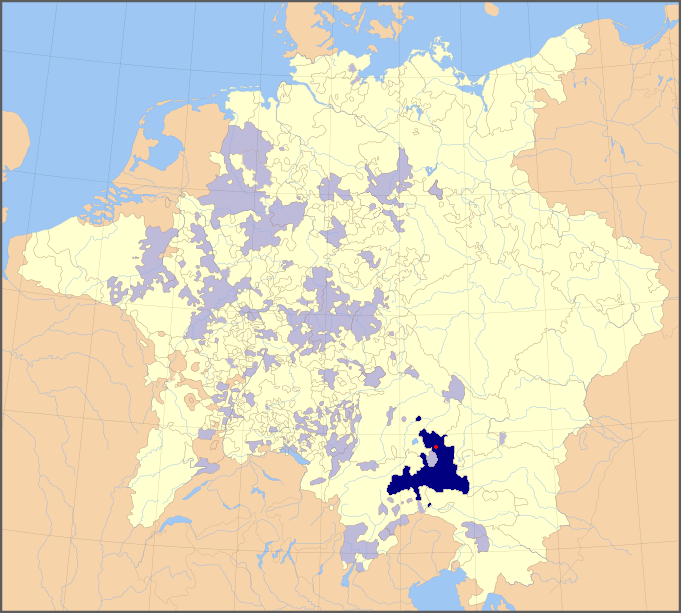
- Salzburg territory (blue) in 1648
- Status: Prince-Archbishopric
- Capital: Salzburg
- Official languages: Medieval Latin; Austro-Bavarian
- Religion: Roman Catholic
- Government: Ecclesiastical principality
- Prince-Archbishop
  - 1772–1803: Count Hieronymus von Colloredo (last)
- Historical era: Middle Ages
  - Diocese founded: 739
  - State constitution: 1328
  - Joined Bavarian Circle: 1500
  - Salzburg Cathedral consecrated: 1628
  - Secularised as the Electorate of Salzburg: 1803
  - Annexed by Austria: 1805
- Currency: Salzburg Thaler
Preceded by	Succeeded by
Duchy of Bavaria	Electorate of Salzburg

The Prince-Archbishopric of Salzburg (Latin: Archiepiscopatus Salisburgensis; German: Fürsterzbistum Salzburg) was an ecclesiastical principality and state of the Holy Roman Empire. It consisted of the secular territories ruled by the archbishops of Salzburg, which were distinct from the larger Archdiocese of Salzburg, founded in 739 by Saint Boniface in the Bavarian stem duchy. Its capital was Salzburg, the former Roman city of Iuvavum.

From the late 13th century, the archbishops of Salzburg gradually achieved Imperial immediacy and greater independence from the Bavarian dukes. The archbishopric became a member of the Bavarian Circle in 1500, and its archbishops held the title of Primas Germaniae, although Salzburg never obtained electoral status during this period. The last prince-archbishop to exercise secular authority was Hieronymus von Colloredo, a patron of the Salzburg-born composer Wolfgang Amadeus Mozart. In 1803, the archbishopric was secularised during the German Mediatisation and replaced by the Electorate of Salzburg.

== Geography ==
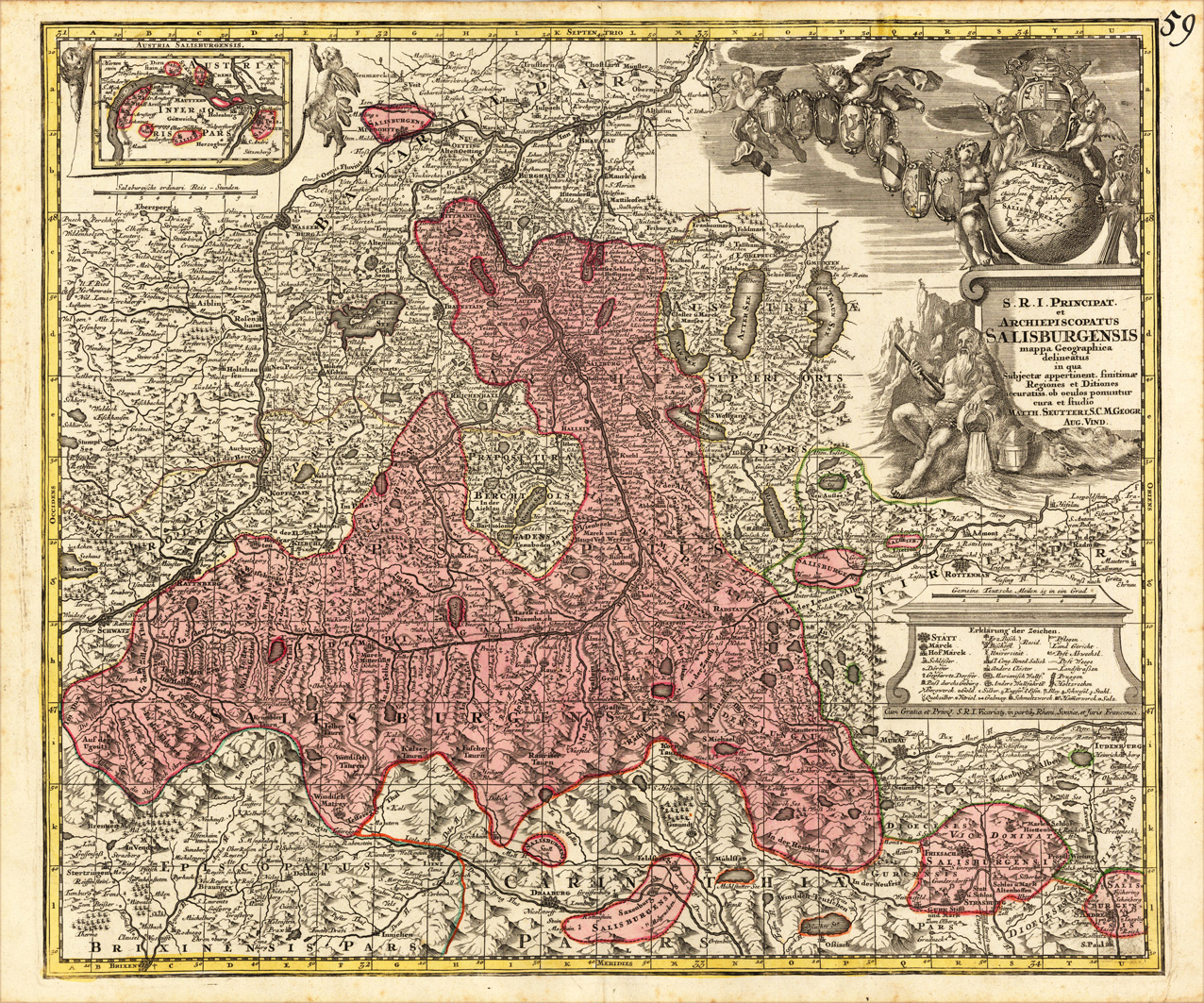
18th century map of the Prince-Archbishopric of Salzburg

The prince-archbishopric's territory was roughly congruent with the present-day Austrian state of Salzburg. It stretched along the Salzach river from the High Tauern range—Mt. Großvenediger at 3,666 m (12,028 ft)—at the main chain of the Alps in the south down to the Alpine foothills in the north. Here it also comprised the present-day Rupertiwinkel on the western shore of the Salzach, which today is part of Bavaria. The former archepiscopal lands are traditionally subdivided into five historic parts (Gaue): Flachgau with the Salzburg capital and Tarus Tennengau around Hallein are both located in the broad Salzach valley at the rim of the Northern Limestone Alps; the mountainous (Innergebirg) southern divisions are Pinzgau, Pongau around Bischofshofen, and southeastern Lungau beyond the Radstädter Tauern Pass.

In the north and east, the prince-archbishopric bordered on the Duchy of Austria, a former Bavarian margraviate, which had become independent in 1156 and, raised to an archduchy in 1457, developed as the nucleus of the Habsburg monarchy. The Salzkammergut border region, today a UNESCO World Heritage Site, as an important salt trade region was gradually seized by the mighty House of Habsburg and incorporated into the Upper Austrian lands. In the southeast, Salzburg adjoined the Duchy of Styria, also ruled by the Habsburg (arch-)dukes in personal union since 1192. By 1335, the Austrian regents had also acquired the old Duchy of Carinthia in the south, the Styrian and Carinthian territories were incorporated into Inner Austria in 1379. The Habsburg encirclement was nearly completed when in 1363 the archdukes also attained the County of Tyrol in the west. Only in the northwest did Salzburg border on the Duchy of Bavaria (raised to an Electorate in 1623), and the tiny Berchtesgaden Provostry, which was able to retain its independence until the Mediatisation in 1803.

== Principality ==
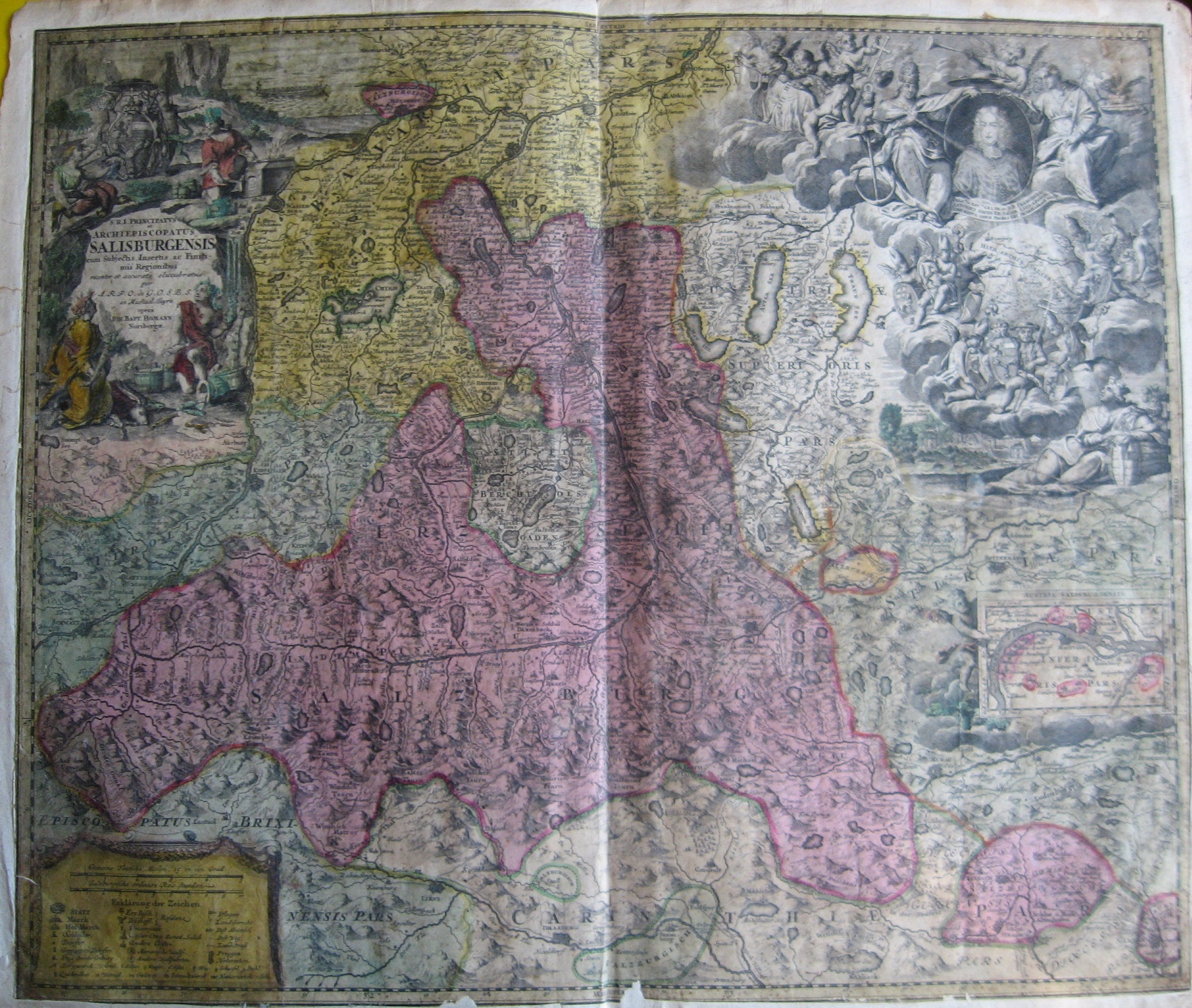
Archbishopric of Salzburg, c. 1715

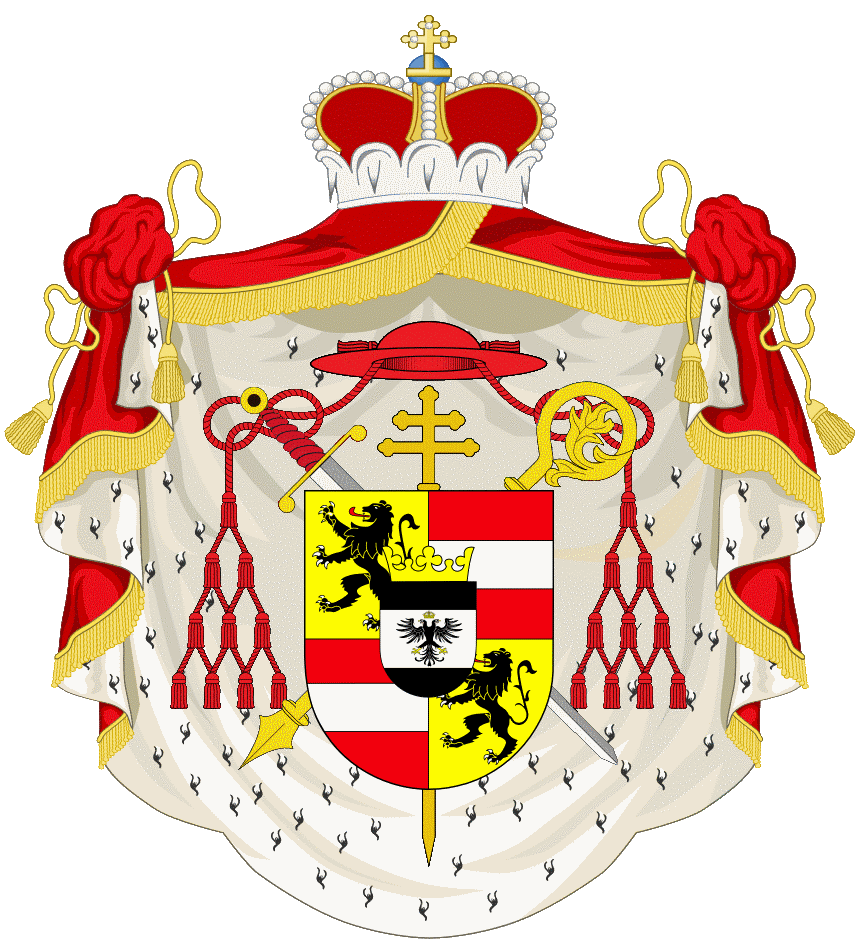
Coat of arms of Hieronymus von Colloredo as Prince-Archbishop of Salzburg, incorporating elements of princely and ecclesiastical heraldry.

Archbishop Eberhard II of Regensberg was made a prince of the Empire in 1213, and created three new sees: Chiemsee (1216), Seckau (1218) and Lavant (1225). In 1241, at the Council of Regensburg he denounced Pope Gregory IX as "that man of perdition, whom they call Antichrist, who in his extravagant boasting says, I am God, I cannot err." During the German Interregnum, Salzburg suffered confusion. Philip of Spanheim, heir to the Dukedom of Carinthia, refused to take priestly consecrations, and was replaced by Ulrich, Bishop of Seckau.

King Rudolph I of Habsburg quarrelled with the archbishops through the manipulations of Abbot Henry of Admont, and after his death the archbishops and the Habsburgs made peace in 1297. The people and archbishops of Salzburgs remained loyal to the Habsburgs in their struggles against the Wittelsbachs. When the Black Death reached Salzburg in 1347, the Jews were accused of poisoning the wells and suffered severe persecution.

In 1473, he summoned the first provincial diet in the history of the archbishopric, and eventually abdicated. It was only Leonard of Keutschach (reigned 1495–1519) who reversed the situation. He had all the burgomasters and town councillors (who were levying unfair taxes) arrested simultaneously and imprisoned in the castle. His last years were spent in bitter struggle against Matthäus Lang of Wellenburg, Bishop of Gurk, who succeeded him in 1519.

Matthäus Lang was largely unnoticed in official circles, although his influence was felt throughout the archbishopric. He brought in Saxon miners, which brought with them Protestant books and teachings. He then attempted to keep the populace Catholic, and during the Latin War was besieged in the Hohen-Salzburg, declared a "monster" by Martin Luther, and two later uprisings by the peasants lead to suffering to the entire archdiocese. Later bishops were wiser in the ruling and spared Salzburg the religious wars and devastation seen elsewhere in Germany. Archbishop Wolf Dietrich von Raitenau gave the Protestants the choice of converting to Catholicism or leaving Salzburg. The cathedral was rebuilt in such splendour that it was unrivalled by all others north of the Alps.

Archbishop Paris of Lodron led Salzburg to peace and prosperity during the Thirty Years' War in which the rest of Germany was thoroughly devastated. During the reign of Leopold Anthony of Firmian, the remaining Protestants in Salzburg were expelled in 1731. He invited the Jesuits to Salzburg and asked for help from the emperor, and finally ordered the Protestants to recant their beliefs or emigrate. Over 20,000 Salzburg Protestants were forced to leave their homes, most of whom accepted an offer of land by King Frederick William I of Prussia.

The last Prince-Archbishop, Hieronymus von Colloredo, is probably best known for his patronage of Mozart. His reforms of the church and education systems alienated him from the people.

== Secularisation ==
In 1803, Salzburg was secularised as the Electorate of Salzburg for the former Grand Duke Ferdinand III of Tuscany (brother of Emperor Francis II), who had lost his throne. In 1805, it became part of Austria. In 1809, it became part of Bavaria which closed the University of Salzburg, banned monasteries from accepting novices, and banned pilgrimages and processions. The archdiocese was reestablished as the Roman Catholic Archdiocese of Salzburg in 1818 without temporal power.

Up to today, the Archbishop of Salzburg has also borne the title Primas Germaniae ("First Bishop of Germany"). The powers of this title – non-jurisdictional – are limited to being the Pope's first correspondent in the German-speaking world, but had once included the right to preside over the Princes of the Holy Roman Empire. The Archbishop also has the title of Legatus Natus ("born legate") to the Pope, which, although not a cardinal, gives the Archbishop the privilege of wearing red vesture (which is much deeper than a cardinal's scarlet), even in Rome.

== List of prince-bishops ==
- Frederick III of Leibnitz 1315–1338
- Henry of Pirnbrunn 1338–1343
- Ordulf of Wiesseneck 1343–1365
- Pilgrim II of Pucheim 1365–1396
- Gregor Schenk of Osterwitz 1396–1403
- Eberhard III of Neuhaus 1403–1427
- Eberhard IV of Starhemberg 1427–1429
- John II of Reichensperg 1429–1441
- Frederick IV Truchseß of Emmerberg 1441–1452
- Sigismund I of Volkersdorf 1452–1461
- Cardinal Burchard of Weissbruch 1461–1466
- Bernhard II of Rohr 1466–1482
- John III Peckenschlager 1482–1489
- Friedrich V of Schallenburg 1489–1494
- Sigismund II of Hollenegg 1494–1495
- Leonhard von Keutschach 1495–1519
- Matthäus Lang von Wellenburg 1519–1540
- Ernest of Bavaria 1540–1554
- Michael of Khuenburg 1554–1560
- John Jacob of Khun-Bellasy 1560–1586
- George of Kuenburg 1586–1587
- Wolf Dietrich von Raitenau 1587–1612
- Marcus Sittich of Hohenems 1612–1619
- Paris von Lodron 1619–1653
- Guidobald of Thun 1654–1668
- Maximilian Gandalf of Kuenburg 1668–1687
- Johann Ernst von Thun 1687–1709
- Franz Anton von Harrach 1709–1727
- Leopold Anton von Firmian 1727–1744
- Jacob Ernest of Liechtenstein-Castelcorno 1744–1747
- Andreas Jacob of Dietrichstein 1747–1753
- Sigismund III of Schrattenbach 1753–1771
- Hieronymus von Colloredo 1772–1812 (last prince-archbishop, lost temporal power in 1803 after secularization)

See Roman Catholic Archdiocese of Salzburg for archbishops since 1812.

== See also ==
- Alte Residenz – city palace
- Schloss Hellbrunn – summer palace
