= University of Salzburg =

University in Austria

- Paris-Lodron-Universität Salzburg
- Latin: Universitas Salisburgensis
- Former name: Benediktineruniversität
- Type: Public
- Active: July 23rd, 1622; 404 years ago–1810 1962 (re-established)
- Budget: € 112.8 million (2007)
- Rector: Bernhard Fügenschuh
- Administrative staff: 2,800 (2013)
- Students: 18,000 (2013/2014)
- Location: Salzburg, Salzburg State, Austria; 47°47′50″N 13°02′53″E
- Website: plus.ac.at

The University of Salzburg (German: Universität Salzburg, pronounced [univɛrsiˈtɛːt ˈsaltsbʊrɡ]), also known as the Paris Lodron University of Salzburg (Paris-Lodron-Universität Salzburg, PLUS), is an Austrian public university in Salzburg municipality, Salzburg State, named after its founder, Prince-Archbishop Paris Lodron.

Established in 1622, the university was closed in 1810 and re-established in 1962. Nowadays, it has around 18,000 students and 2,800 employees; it is the largest educational institution in Salzburg State. It is divided into six faculties: Catholic Theology, Law and Economics, Cultural Sciences, Social Sciences, Natural Sciences, Analytical and Life Sciences.

== Benedictine University ==
On 23 July 1622, Archbishop Paris Lodron appointed the scholar Albert Keuslin first rector of the Benedictine university. Keuslin, a graduate of the Jesuit University of Dillingen, had established the Akademisches Gymnasium, a secondary school, at Salzburg five years earlier. By resolution of Emperor Ferdinand II, issued on October 8, the Gymnasium was raised to a university. While the Thirty Years' War raged outside the Archbishopric of Salzburg, the university was built up and maintained by a federation of Benedictine abbeys from Salzburg, Switzerland, Bavaria and Austria. In its early years, courses taught were theology, divinity, philosophy, law, and medicine.

During the Napoleonic Wars, the Prince-Archbishopric was secularized as the Electorate of Salzburg in 1803. It was ruled by Archduke Ferdinand of Austria, a brother of Emperor Francis II, former Grand Duke of Tuscany (as Ferdinand III), who established a Faculty of Medicine. After Salzburg was annexed by the Kingdom of Bavaria in 1810, however, the university was closed on 24 December and replaced by a Lyzeum college with sections for divinity and philosophy, as well as a school for medicine and surgery. After the Napoleonic Wars, Salzburg became part of the Austrian Empire.

University rankings

Global – Overall
- QS World: =650 (2026)

The divinity section was again converted to a faculty in 1850. In World War I, plans were evolved to relocate the Francis Joseph University from Czernowitz to Salzburg, though never carried out.

== University of Salzburg ==
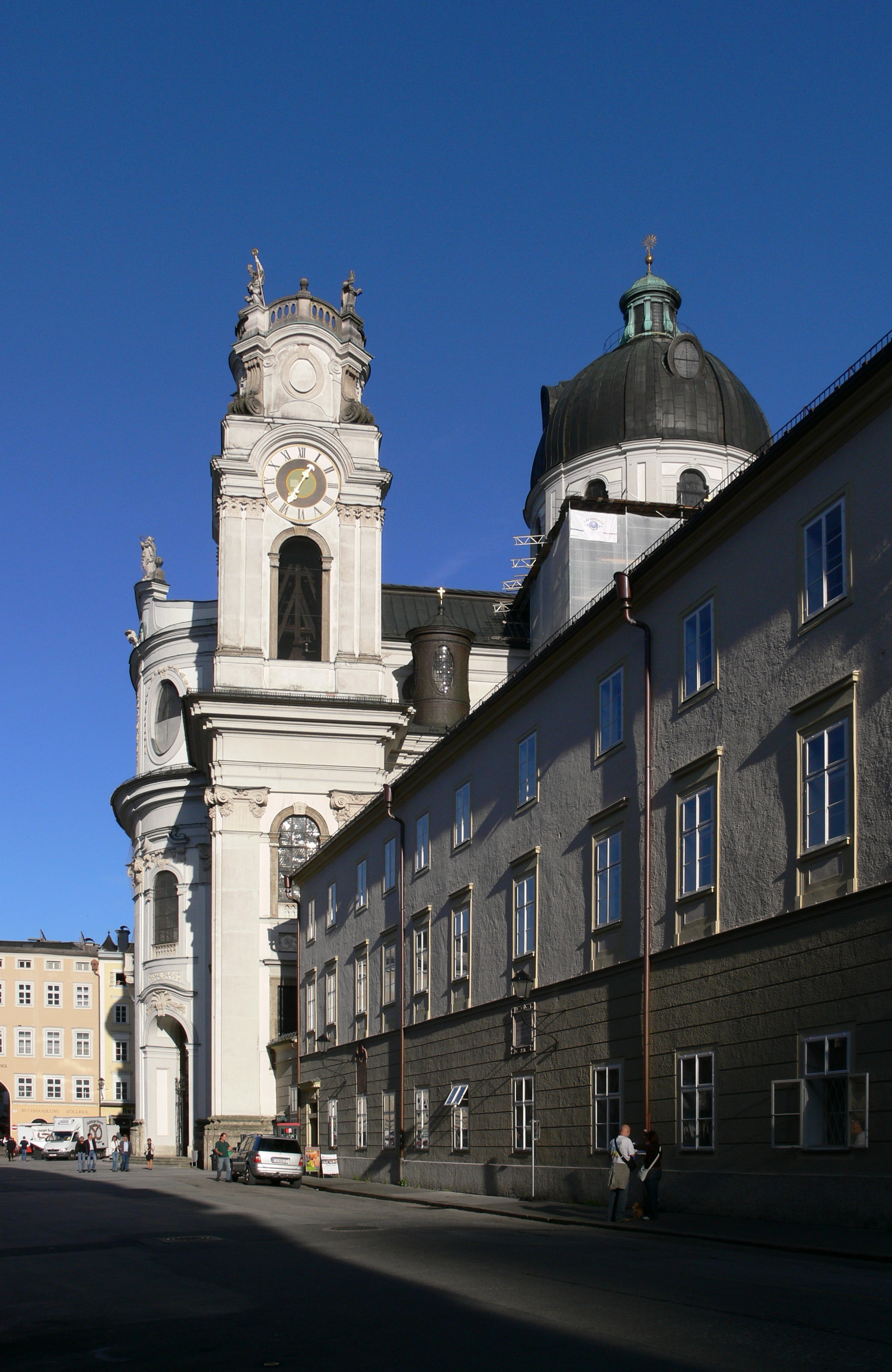
Faculty of Catholic theology and Kollegienkirche

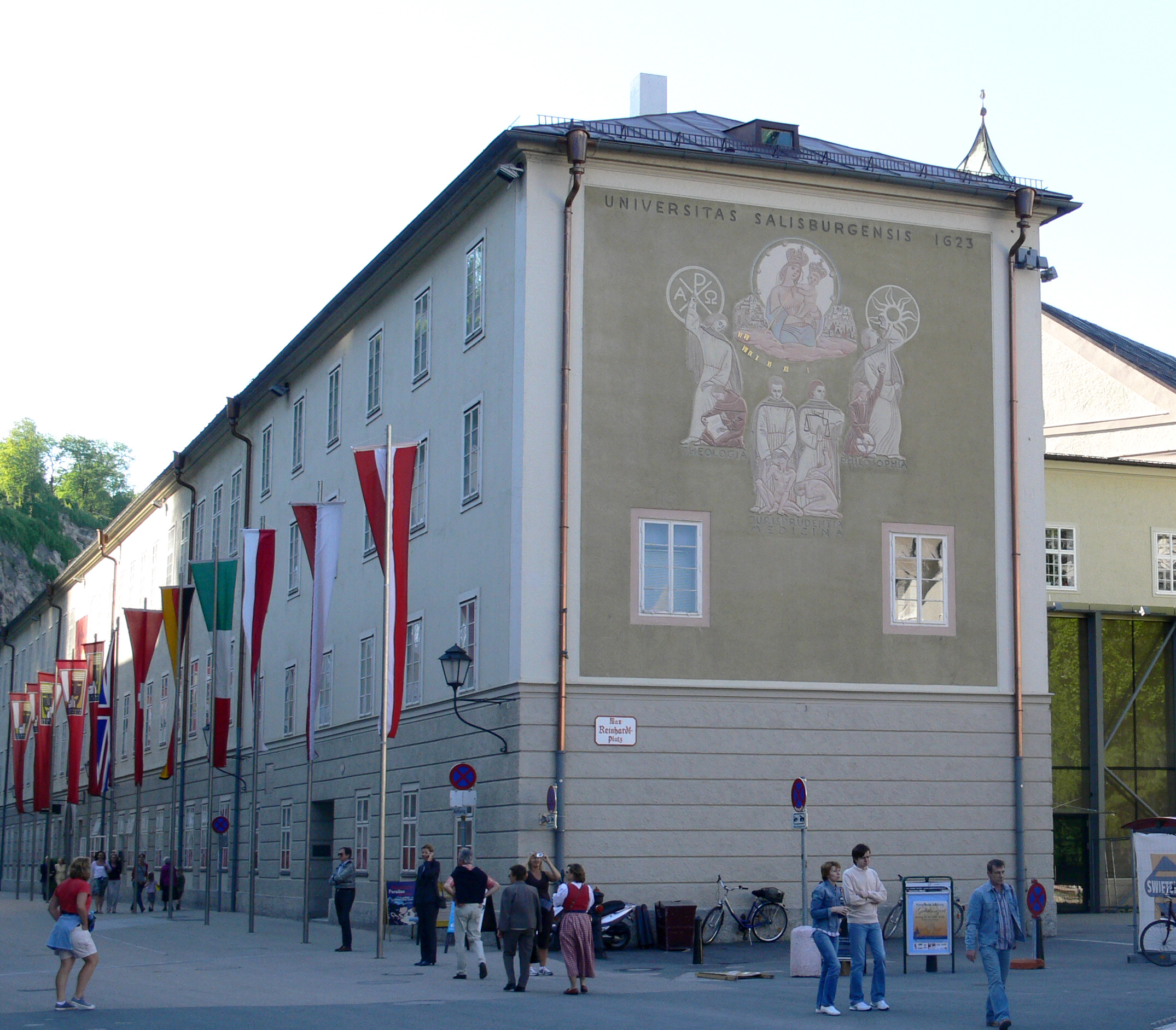
University library

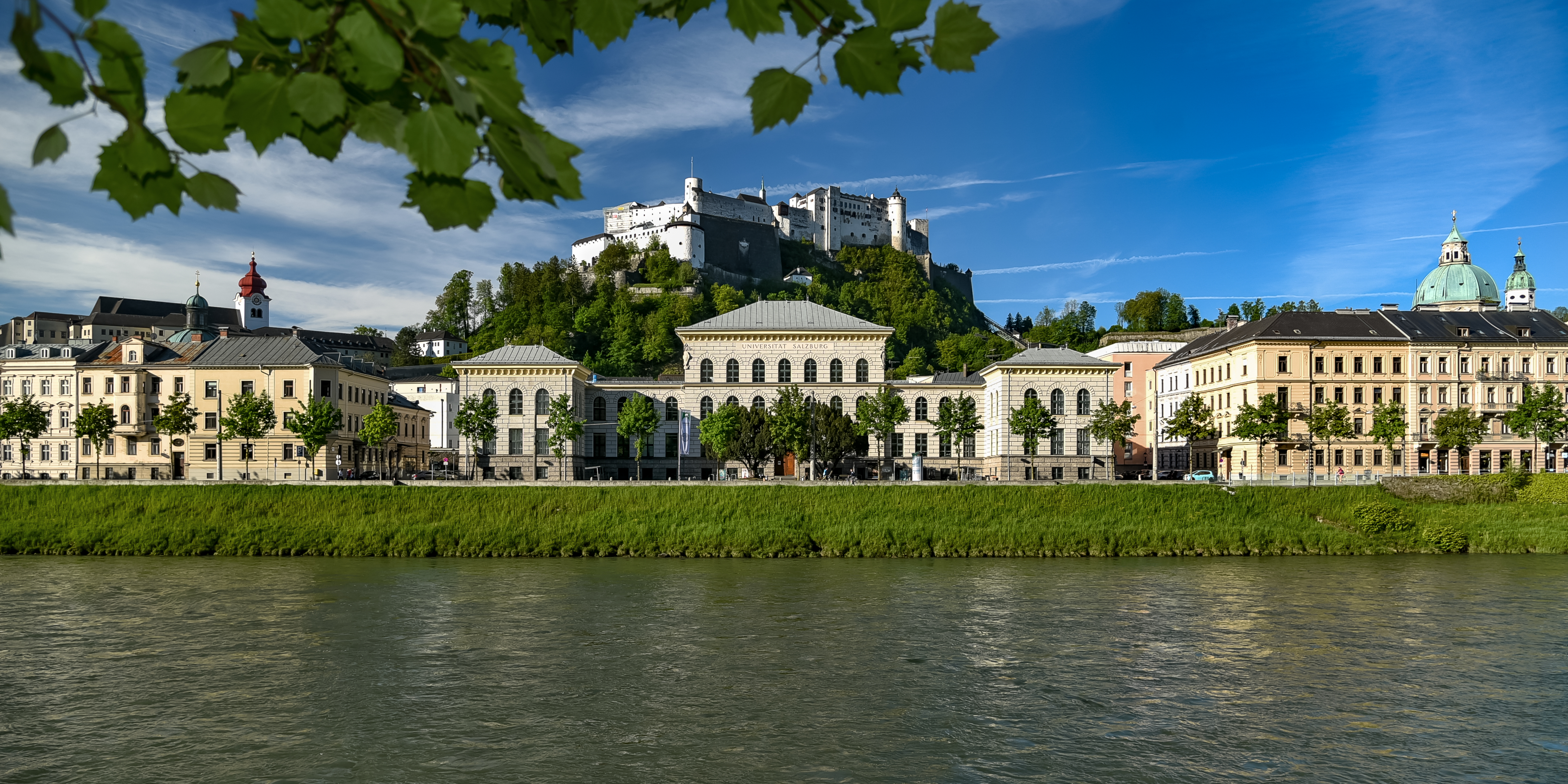
University building with Hohensalzburg Fortress in the background

The University of Salzburg was not re-established until 1962, with a faculty of Catholic theology and a faculty of philosophy. Classes resumed in 1964, with a faculty of law added the following year. In 1975, a new federal law regulated the organisation of all Austrian universities. The University of Salzburg created four academic divisions: the Faculty of Catholic Theology, the Faculty of Law, the Faculty of Humanities, and the Faculty of Natural Sciences. A fifth division, the Faculty of Medicine, was not realized.

In 1995, the organisation of Austrian universities was further restructured with more faculty autonomy. The university gradually incorporated new academic programs through 2004 into 32 Fachbereiche or “departments”, and again, decided not to create a Faculty of Medicine.

== Locations ==
The University of Salzburg has no central campus, occupying several buildings in Salzburg's historic centre: parts of the Salzburg Residenz building (Toskanatrakt) and on Kapitelgasse south of Salzburg Cathedral. The university library is located between the Kollegienkirche (the University Church) and the Großes Festspielhaus; attached to it is the Große Aula, or ceremonial hall.

The traditional faculty building of Humanities (Communication Studies, Sociology and Political Science) is located by the Rudolfskai. The Faculty of Sciences is located just further south.

Completed in 2011, the Unipark Nonntal campus (replacing the old location at the Akademiestraße) is home to the departments of modern languages, and cultural and social sciences. The building is 17,000 square metres in size, with 5,500 students and 300 academic staff. There is a library and an Auditorium Maximum. Financing for the construction of the Unipark Nonntal was enabled by successful negotiations between Salzburg’s state governor Franz Schausberger and the Federal Ministry of Education. Originally designed in 2002 by architects Storch Ehlers Partners, it was constructed in three years.

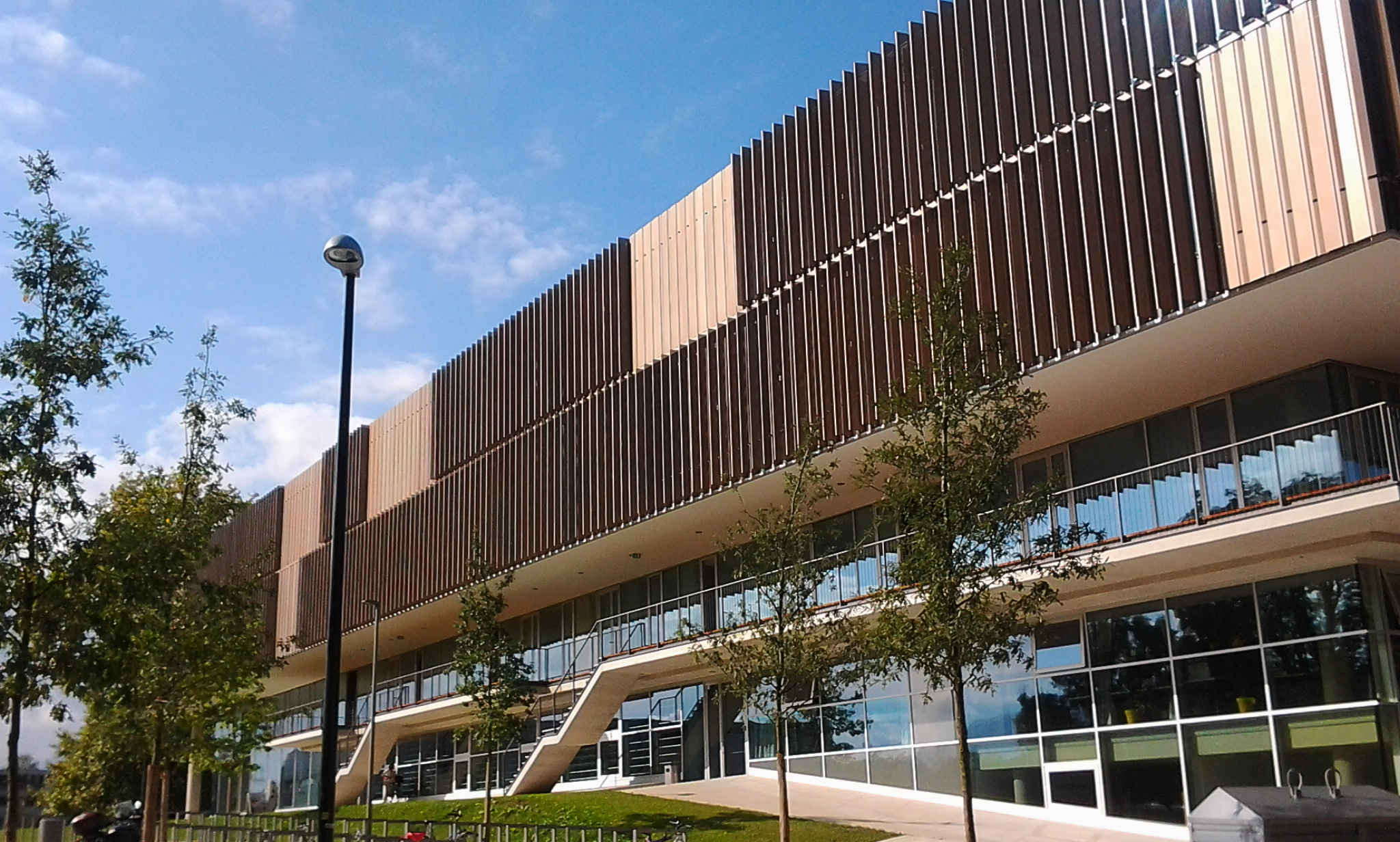
Unipark – south side

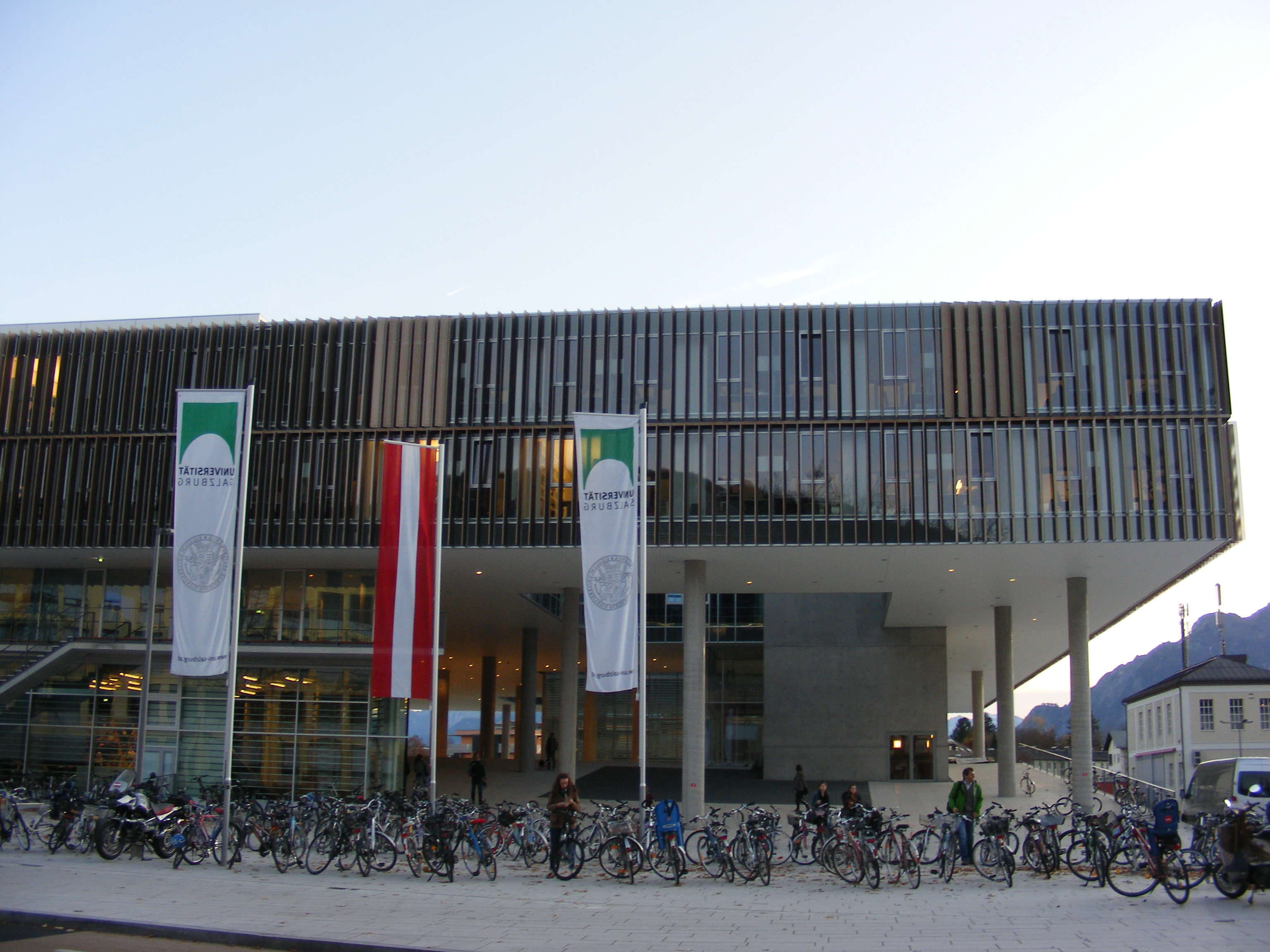
Main entrance

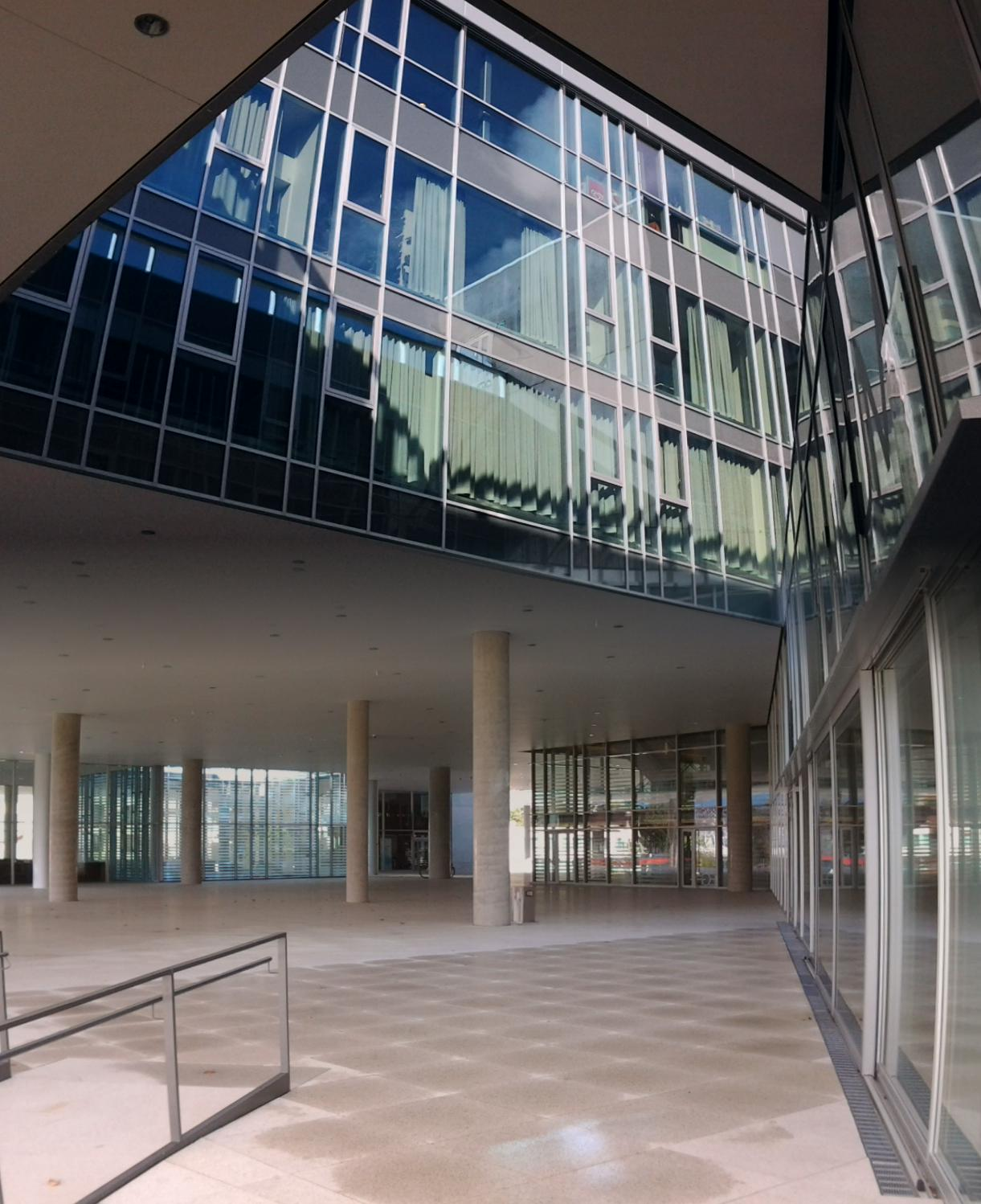
Interior

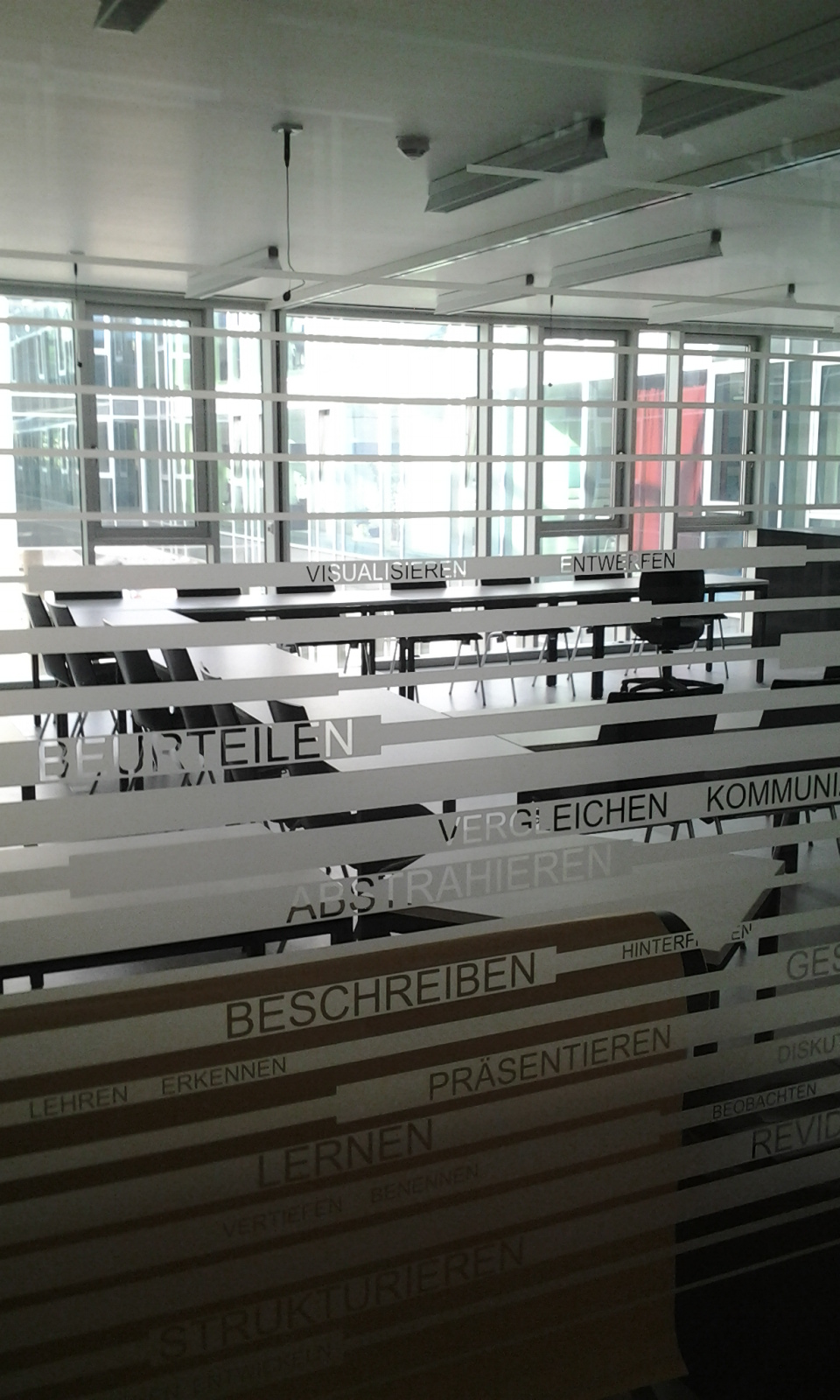
Lecture room

Smaller university offices and institutes are scattered throughout the city, with arts and music being taught at the Mozarteum University Salzburg.

== Alumni ==
- Bettina Bäumer (born 1940), Austrian-born Indian scholar and Indologist
- Gabi Burgstaller (born 1963), Austrian politician
- Wolfgang Eder (born 1952), Austrian iron steel manager
- Renate Egger-Wenzel (born 1961), Austrian professor of Old Testament
- Christine Esterházy (born 1959), German opera singer
- Benita Ferrero-Waldner (born 1948), Austrian diplomat and politician
- Alexandra Föderl-Schmid (born 1971), Austrian journalist
- Karl-Markus Gauß (born 1954), Austrian novelist
- Erich Hackl (born 1955), Austrian novelist and short-story writer
- Gerhart Holzinger (born 1947), Austrian constitutional lawyer
- Ivan Illich (1926–2002), Austrian philosopher
- Hannes Leitgeb (born 1972), Austrian philosopher and mathematician
- Erwin Kräutler (born 1939), Roman Catholic bishop
- Peter Launsky-Tieffenthal (born 1957), Austrian diplomat
- Andreas Maislinger (born 1955), Austrian historian and political scientist
- Leopold Mozart (1719–1787), German composer
- Marie-Louise Nosch (born 1970), Danish archaeologist
- Brigitta Pallauf (born 1960), Austrian politician
- Tobias Regner (born 1982) German singer, songwriter
- Franz Schausberger (born 1950), Austrian politician and historian
- Bernardin Schellenberger (born 1944), German Catholic theologian, priest and former Trappist
- Ute Wartenberg, German numismatist
- Stefan Weber (born 1970), Austrian media researcher
- Karl von Habsburg (born 1961), Austrian politician
- Karoline Edtstadler (born 1981), Austrian politician

== See also ==
- List of early modern universities in Europe
