= Salisbury (disambiguation) =

Salisbury is a city in Wiltshire, England.

Salisbury may also refer to:

== Places ==
=== Australia ===
- Salisbury, New South Wales, a village about 28 km north west of Dungog
- Salisbury, Queensland, a suburb in the City of Brisbane
  - Salisbury railway station, Brisbane
- Salisbury, South Australia
  - City of Salisbury, South Australia
  - Salisbury railway station, Adelaide
- Salisbury Highway, a main road in Adelaide
- Salisbury, Victoria, a crossing loop on the Melbourne–Adelaide railway

=== Canada ===
- Salisbury, New Brunswick
- Salisbury Parish, New Brunswick
- Salisbury Island (Nunavut)
- Salisbury Composite High School, Sherwood Park, Alberta

=== United Kingdom ===
- Salisbury Cathedral
- Salisbury District, Wiltshire
- Diocese of Salisbury
- Salisbury Racecourse
- Salisbury Plain
- Salisbury Dock
- The Salisbury, a pub in Harringay, London
- The Salisbury, Covent Garden, a pub in Covent Garden, London
- Salisbury Crags, in Holyrood Park, Scotland
- Salisbury (UK Parliament constituency)

=== United States ===
- Salisbury Sound, Alaska
- Salisbury, Connecticut
  - Salisbury School
- Salsbury Cove, Maine
- Salisbury, Maryland
  - Salisbury University
- Salisbury, Massachusetts, a New England town
  - Salisbury (CDP), Massachusetts, the urban portion of the town
- Salisbury, Missouri
- Salisbury, New Hampshire
- Salisbury, Herkimer County, New York
- Salisbury, Nassau County, New York
- Iona Island (New York), once known as Salisbury Island
- Salisbury, North Carolina
- Salisbury District, North Carolina, an historic legislative and military district in the United States, circa 1766
- Salisbury, Pennsylvania
- Salisbury, Vermont
- Salisbury (Chesterfield County, Virginia), a former 18th century plantation and house once home to Confederate General Edward Johnson
- Salisbury Township (disambiguation)

=== Elsewhere ===
- Harare, originally Salisbury, the capital of Zimbabwe (formerly Rhodesia)
- Salisbury Island (Russia), also transcribed as Solsberi Island
- Salisbury, Dominica
  - Salisbury (Dominica constituency)
- Salisbury Road, Hong Kong

== People ==
=== Peerages ===
- Earl of Salisbury, created five times since 1145
- Marquess of Salisbury, created in 1789, seven holders since
  - Robert Gascoyne-Cecil, 3rd Marquess of Salisbury, British prime minister in late 19th century

=== Given name ===
- Salisbury Adams (1925–2004), American lawyer and politician

=== Surname ===
- Abigail Salisbury, Pennsylvania politician
- Benjamin Salisbury (born 1980), American actor
- Brett Salisbury (born 1968), American college football quarterback
- Chad Salisbury (born 1976), quarterback for the Grand Rapids Rampage
- Cheryl Salisbury (born 1974), Australia football player
- Edward James Salisbury (1886–1978), director of the Royal Botanic Gardens at Kew
- Enoch Salisbury (1819–1890), Welsh barrister, author and politician
- Frank O. Salisbury (1874–1962), artist
- George Salisbury (disambiguation), several people

- George Salisbury (governor), U.S. Navy officer and Naval Governor of Guam
- George Salisbury (director) (born 1972), film and music video director and graphic designer

- Harold Salisbury, South Australian police commissioner
- Harrison Salisbury (1908–1993), New York Times correspondent in Moscow after World War II
- Harry Salisbury (1855–1933), Major League Baseball pitcher
- Henry Salisbury (1561–1637), Welsh lexicographer
- Ian Salisbury (born 1970), English cricketer
- James Salisbury (1823–1905), inventor of the Salisbury steak
- Joe Salisbury (born 1992), British tennis player
- John of Salisbury (c. 1120–1180), English author, diplomat and bishop of Chartres
- Joyce E. Salisbury (born 1944), American historian
- Ken Salisbury (born 1953), English/Australian boxer
- Mary Salisbury (1917–2008), English Labour politician
- Matt Salisbury (born 1993), English cricketer
- Mike Salisbury (born 1942), British television producer of nature documentaries
- Peter Salisbury (born 1971), drummer of The Verve
- Richard Anthony Salisbury (1761–1829), British botanist
- Richard Frank Salisbury (1926–1989), Canadian anthropologist
- Rollin D. Salisbury (1858–1922), American geologist
- Sally Salisbury or Sarah Pridden (c. 1692–1724), prostitute
- Sean Salisbury (born 1963), former NFL and CFL quarterback
- Suzanne Salisbury, American politician

== Other uses ==
- HMS Salisbury, various Royal Navy ships
- Salisbury (album), a 1971 album by Uriah Heep
- Salisbury RFC, a rugby union club in Salisbury, Wiltshire
- Salisbury station (disambiguation), stations of the name
- Salisbury steak, ground beef shaped to resemble a steak
- Salisbury Garden, an exhibition garden in Kowloon, Hong Kong
- SS City of Salisbury (1943), an Ellerman Lines ship

== See also ==
- Solsbury Hill
- Solsberry, Indiana
- Salsburgh, North Lanarkshire, Scotland
- Salesbury (disambiguation)
- Salusbury (disambiguation)
- Sainsbury (disambiguation)
- Salisbury Convention, a constitutional convention in the United Kingdom
- Salisbury Review, a British conservative magazine
