= Salusbury =

Salusbury or Salesbury may refer to:

- Salesbury, a village in Lancashire, England

Surname
(many people up to the 18th century are named with both spellings — Salusbury or Salesbury — in different sources)

- Salusbury family, a prominent Anglo-Welsh family
- George Salusbury, MP for Denbigh Boroughs in 1545
- John Salusbury (disambiguation)
- Robert Salesbury (1567–99), MP variously for Denbighshire and Merioneth
- Theodora Salusbury (1875-1956) English stained glass artist
- Thomas Salusbury (disambiguation)
- William Salusbury (disambiguation)

Given name

- Salusbury Cade (1660?–1720), English physician
- Salusbury Mellor (1863–1917), represented Great Britain in the 10- to 20-ton yacht competition at the 1900 Olympics
- Salusbury Pryce Humphreys (1778–1845), Royal Navy officer

== See also ==
- Salisbury (disambiguation)
- Salusbury-Trelawny baronets
