= Salsburg =

Salsburg may refer to:

- David Salsburg (born 1931), an American author

Variant spelling of

- Salsburgh, North Lanarkshire, Scotland.
- Salzburg (disambiguation)

== See also ==
- Salzberg (disambiguation)
- Salisbury (disambiguation)
