= Saalburg (surname) =

Saalburg is a surname. Notable people with the name include:

- Allen Saalburg (1899–1987), American painter, illustrator, and screen printer
- Charles W. Saalburg (1865–1947), American cartoonist and illustrator

== See also ==
- Salberg
- Saltzberg
- Salzburg (disambiguation)
