= Samuel Urlsperger =

German Lutheran theologian

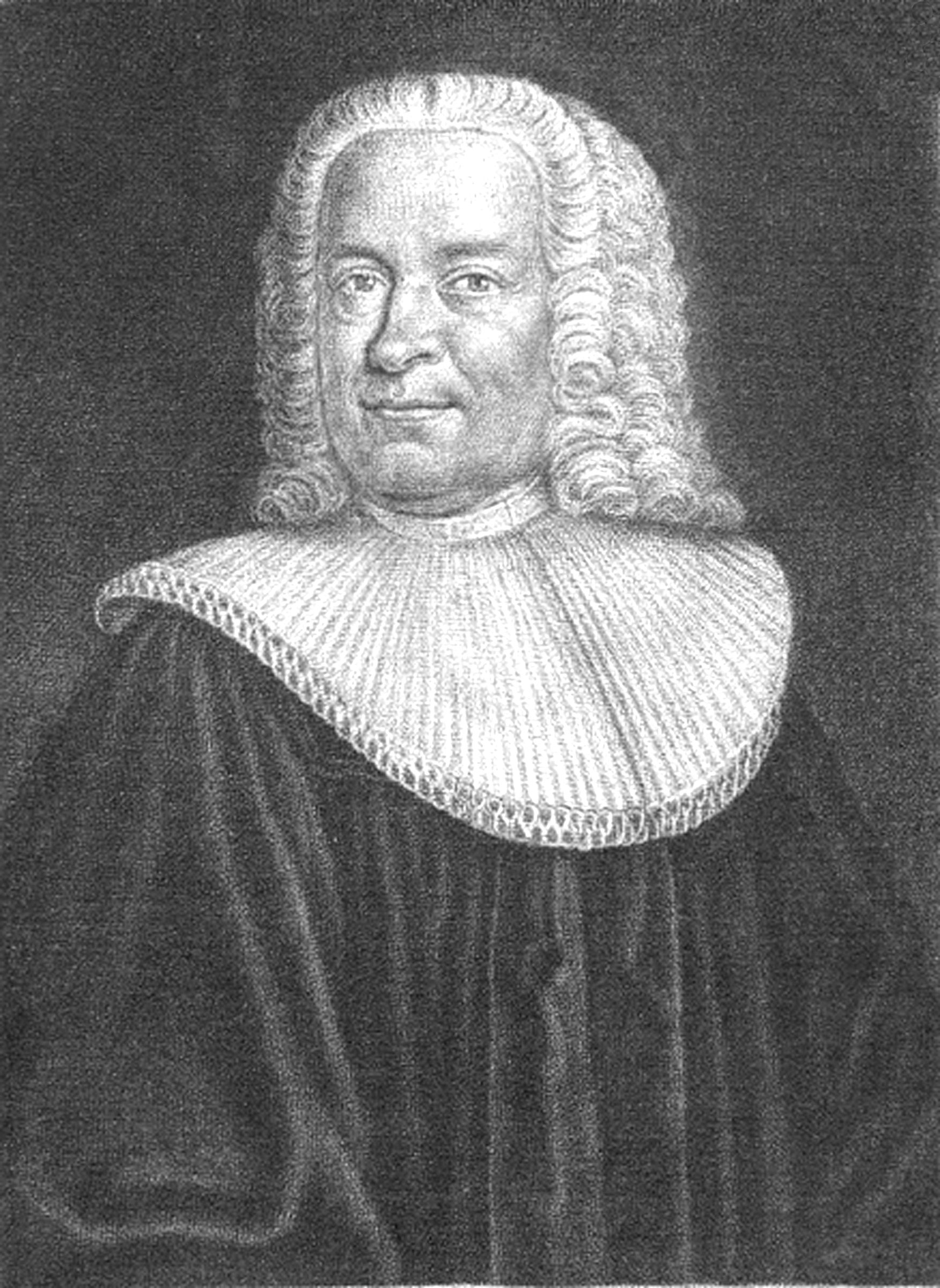
Samuel Urlsperger, portrait by Johann Jacob Haid, c. 1750

Samuel Urlsperger (August 31, 1685 – April 21, 1772 in Augsburg, Germany) was a German Lutheran theologian with pietistic orientations.

== Life ==
Urlsperger was born in the Swabian town of Kirchheim unter Teck in Württemberg. He came from a former prestigious and wealthy Hungarian family that, during the Thirty Years' War, was forced to emigrate like many other Protestants in Hungary and Styria due to religious persecution by the Habsburg authorities.

He attended the local town school and the gymnasium of Blaubeuren Abbey. Funded by the Dowager Duchess Magdalena Sibylla of Hesse-Darmstadt, Urlsperger completed his theological studies in Tübingen until 1707. He went on to study at the knight academy in Erlangen, at the University of Jena, and with August Hermann Francke (1663–1727) in Halle. A study trip led him to places like Leiden, Utrecht and to the Savoy Chapel in London, where he worked with Anton Wilhelm Böhme (1673–1722). Here he contacted the Anglican "Society for Promoting Christian Knowledge", whose aspirations resembled the "Halle Pietism" of Philipp Jacob Spener (1635–1705). Back in Germany, he established the "English house for students from England" on the premises of the Francke Foundations in Halle.

Shortly afterwards, Urlsperger became a preacher in Stetten im Remstal. He was appointed chaplain at the Württemberg court in Stuttgart in 1714 and became a ducal court preacher in 1715. However, from time to time he stayed in prison for openly criticizing the lifestyle of Duke Eberhard Louis of Württemberg, who had rejected his consort Johanna Elisabeth of Baden-Durlach in favour of his mistress Wilhelmine von Grävenitz.

In 1720 Urlsperger again became a pastor and superintendent in Herrenberg; three years later he became a pastor of the Main Church of St. Anne in the Imperial City of Augsburg, where he would later be granted the title of Senior of the Evangelical Ministry. Urlsperger also served as a local agent and as a diplomat fully authorized to represent his government.

== Salzburg emigrants ==
While in Augsburg, Urlsperger from 1735 to 1752 edited the 18 Continuations of the "Detailed Reports on the Salzburger emigrants who settled in America" which contain the diaries and letters of two pastors, Johann Martin Boltzius and Israel Christian Gronau. These men accompanied and helped Urlsperger to transfer Salzburg Protestants, exiled from their lands by Prince-archbishop Leopold Anton von Firmian, and settle them at Ebenezer near Savannah, Georgia. He edited and published portions of his correspondence with the emigrants' pastors, passages from the pastors' travel diaries, and reports from the Royal British Commissioner, Baron Georg Philipp Friedrich von Reck, a Hanoverian nobleman, who accompanied the emigrants.

In 1733, Urlsperger and the English Society for the Promotion of Christian Knowledge invited a group of Salzburgers to travel to the Colony of Georgia; they accepted the invitation and were then transported under various terms, such as: they would receive free passage from Rotterdam (where they would meet with Boltzius and Gronau) to Georgia; the head of every family would be given fifty acres of land in Georgia; and the Salzburgers would be guaranteed religious liberty and the rights of English citizens. At Rotterdam, Urslperger and the Salzburgers were joined by Boltzius and Gronau. Altogether they traveled to England, where they took the oath of allegiance to the British Government on January 8, 1734 in order to set sail for Georgia on the ship "Purisburg" under Captain Coram.

A great quantity of archives that document the Salzburgers' emigration to America are available. Nevertheless, they do not seem to answer basic questions that still remain regarding their justification for their trans-Atlantic journey. The reasons for the Salzburgers to emigrate to Georgia are unclear, however, Urlsperger believed that convincing the Salzburgers of emigrating to Georgia was of the uttermost importance despite having the opportunity of following the call of the Prussian king to settle in his East Prussian or Lithuanian territories. A text that was published by an anonymous author in 1733 in Frankfurt demonstrated a balance sheet of the advantages and disadvantages of a respective emigration to Prussia or America. Although he tried to refute the arguments favoring Prussia, Urlsperger ultimately admitted that travelling to Georgia would be more dangerous and much less certain of success than the simple journey to the Prussian lands. Urlsperger concluded his apology, however, by emphasizing that religion was the main reason of their emigration to America. "If the emigrants were to desert the cross and seek only a good life, they would not be faithful pilgrims," said Urlsperger.

Urlsperger died highly honored in Augsburg at the age of 86.
