= Lutheran Church of the Ascension (Savannah, Georgia) =

Church in Savannah, Georgia, U.S.

- Evangelical Lutheran Church of the Ascension
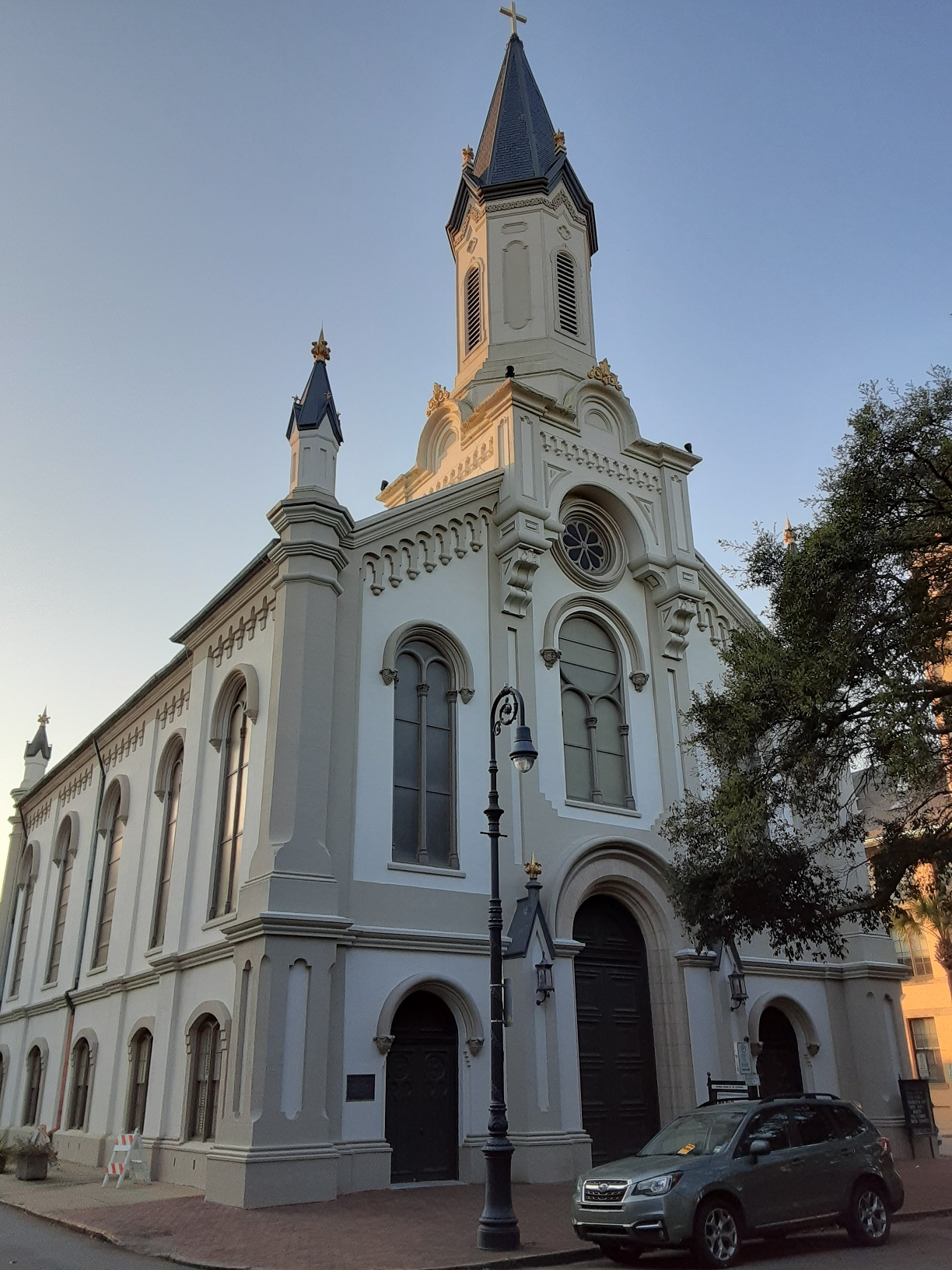
- Lutheran Church of the Ascension (2022)
- Lutheran Church of the Ascension
- 32°4′40.6″N 81°5′30″W
- Location: 120 Bull Street; Savannah, Georgia 31401
- Denomination: Evangelical Lutheran Church in America
- Website: www.ascensionsavannah.org

History
- Founded: April 14, 1741

Architecture
- Completed: 1843
- Lutheran Church of the Ascension
- U.S. Historic district – Contributing property
- Part of: Savannah Historic District (Savannah, Georgia) (ID66000277)
- Added to NRHP: November 13, 1966

The Lutheran Church of the Ascension is a historic Lutheran church on Bull Street in Savannah, Georgia, located in the Savannah Historic District. The congregation was founded by Johann Martin Boltzius in 1741, with the current building constructed in 1843.

== History ==
On April 14, 1741, the congregation was organized by Johann Martin Boltzius, who was the pastor for the Salzburger emigrants in Ebenezer, Georgia. In 1756, the congregation purchased the land where the current building stands, adjacent to Wright Square. In 1772, the congregation purchased a former wooden courthouse building, which they had moved to the site. This building would be the first Lutheran church building in the city. In 1774, noted Lutheran pastor Henry Muhlenberg preached to a congregation of about 200 in the building.

The current building was built in 1843, with major remodeling occurring between 1875 and 1879. This building features a large stained glass window depicting the ascension of Jesus. During the American Civil War, the church served as a field hospital, and Union soldiers occupied the building.

== See also ==
- National Register of Historic Places listings in Chatham County, Georgia

== Bibliography ==
- Fraser, Walter J. Jr. (2003). Savannah in the Old South. University of Georgia Press. ISBN 978-0-8203-2776-1 – via Google Books.
- "Lutheran Church of the Ascension (Founded, 1741)". Georgia Historical Society. June 16, 2014.
- Triplett, Whip Morrison (2006). Savannah. Arcadia Publishing. ISBN 978-0-7385-4209-6 – via Google Books.
