= Philipp Georg Friedrich von Reck =

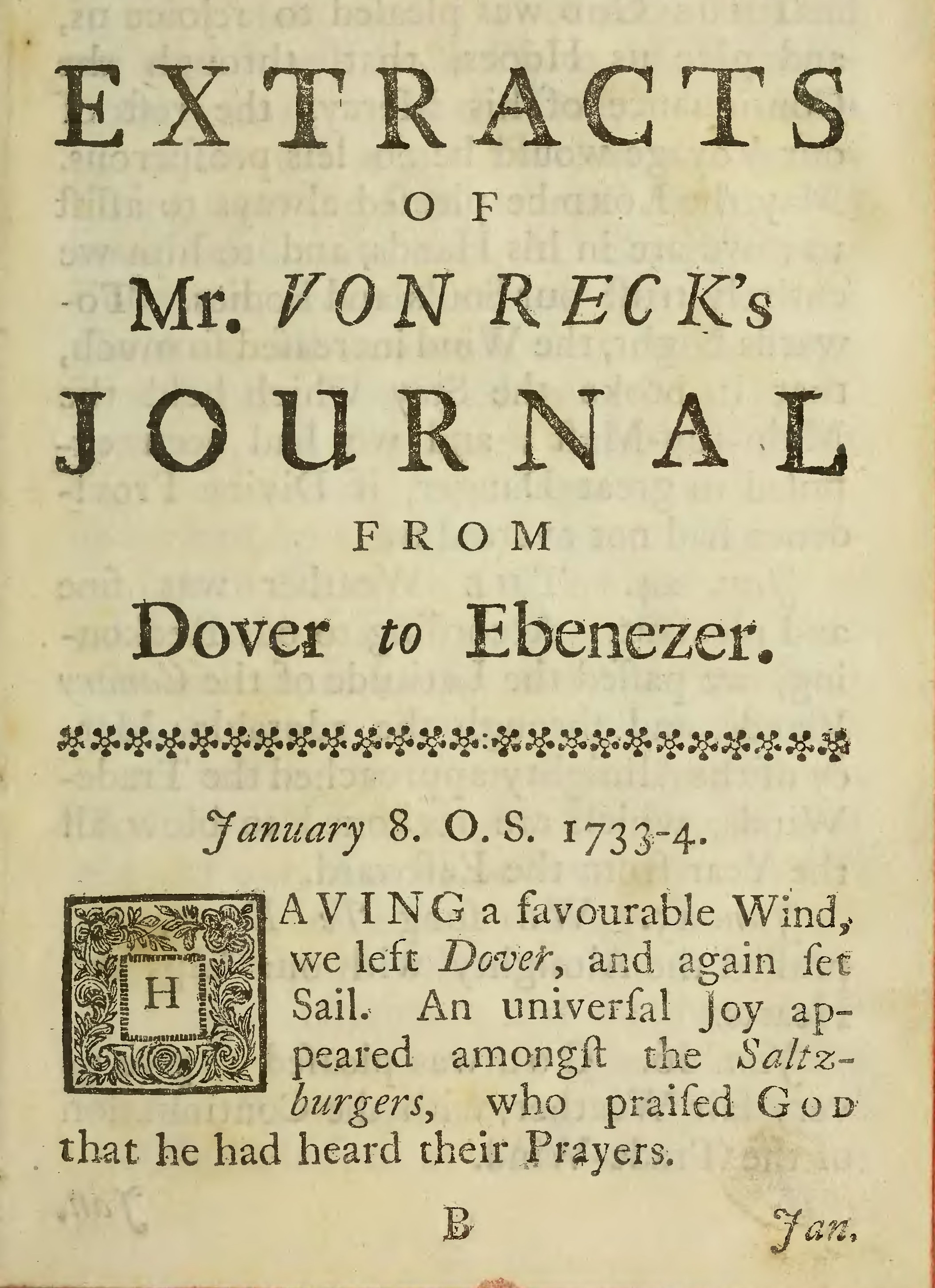
Philipp von Reck's journal published in England, 1734

Philipp Georg Friedrich von Reck (1710–1798) was a Freiherr of Hanover who after making two journeys to the Colony of Georgia in 1730s joined the Hanover and Danish civil service.

== Biography ==
Von Reck was born into nobility and held a land charter for 500 acres in America under certain contingencies of qualification. He accompanied the Salzburger Emigrants, German-speaking Lutheran settlers who were expelled from the Catholic principality of Salzburg, on their relocation voyage to Ebenezer, Georgia. He became a part of the first and third transports of the Salzburgers being responsible for secular affairs. Von Reck was described by his contemporaries as charming and enthusiastic but totally inexperienced young commissary. He was stripped of his responsibilities after repeated disputes with Johann Martin Boltzius and the competing commissary Jean Vat.

After the first voyage, von Reck left Georgia with vivid utopian descriptions of what he experienced. He wrote about Native Americans with great sympathy:

They are very courteous, friendly, and hospitable towards strangers, with whom they quickly become acquainted. Their table is open to everyone, and one can sit at it uninvited. When an Indian want to assure someone of his friendship, he strikes himself with his right hand on his left breast and says, my breast is like your breast, my and your breast is one breast the equivalent of my and your heart is one heart, my heart is closely bound with your heart, etc. And it is all so a sign of friendship and welcome to light a pipe of tobacco and hold it up before the arriving stranger so that he can take a couple of draws on it, also to hold up a bottle of rum, so he can take a swallow from it. ... They are satisfied with the little that they have, even if it consists only of a gun, kettle, and mirror. They keep their word, and hate lies. When they praise a European, they say that he has never told them an untruth. They are affectionate and live peaceably with their wives.

His journal was published in 1734 in German and English. He came back to Ebenezer on February 7, 1736 with the third transport of which he was in charge. Ultimately, Von Reck never formalized his land claim and returned to Europe where he entered the Hanover and later Danish civil service.

Von Reck not only kept a journal of his time in America but also made his own drawings. However, the drawings and watercolor sketches were made public only in 1977 after they were discovered at the Royal Library in Copenhagen. They show his encounters with indigenous people, nature and wildlife in America. These images and journal are considered important source for the study of the Creek and especially Yuchi indigenous societies during the period of Von Reck's travels to America.
