= Johann Martin Boltzius =

American German-born lutheran pastor

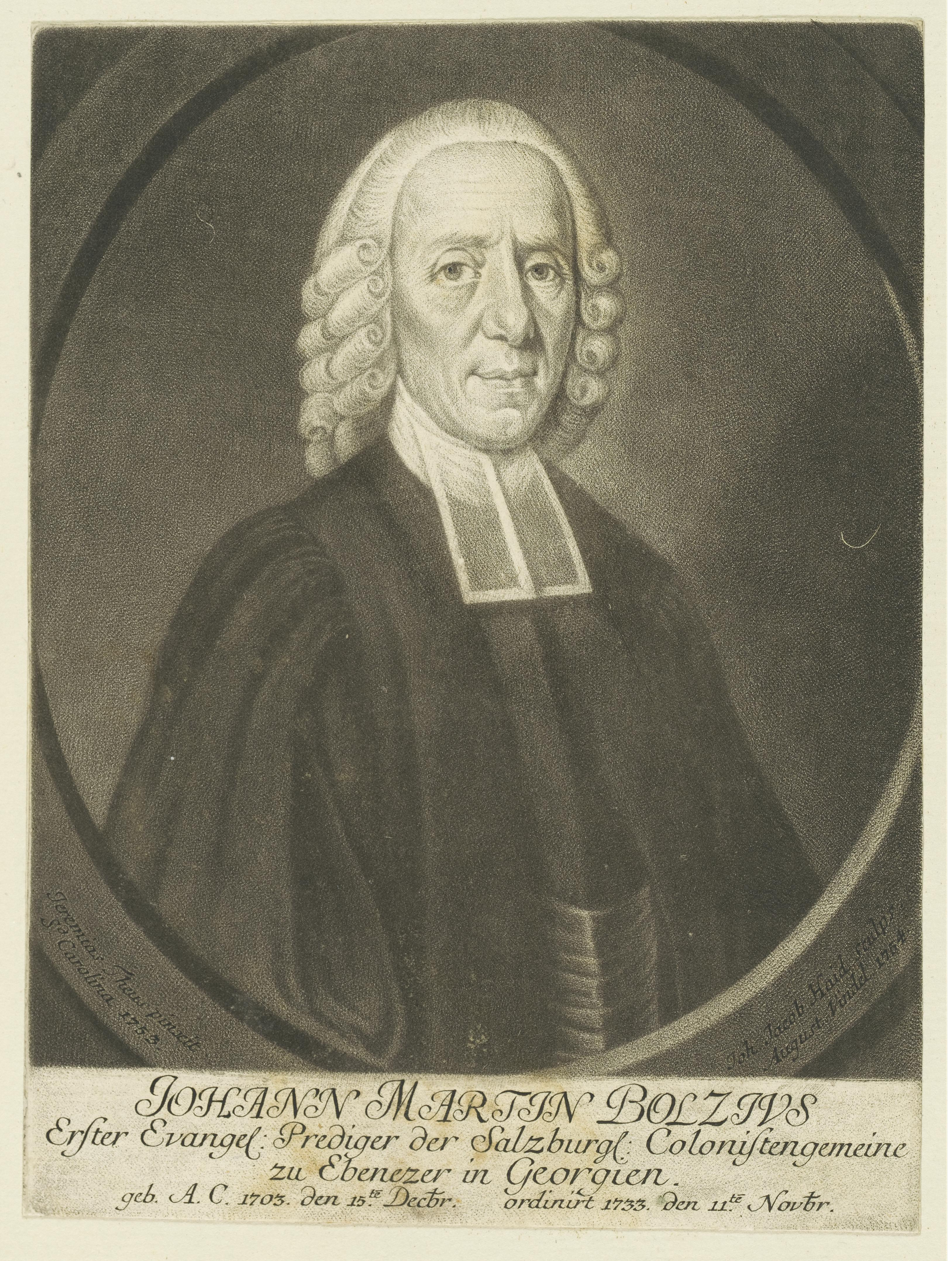
Boltzius

Johann Martin Boltzius (December 15, 1703 – November 19, 1765) was a German-born American Lutheran minister. He is most known for his association with the Salzburger emigrants, a group of German-speaking Protestant refugees who migrated to the British colony of Georgia in 1734. They founded the city of Ebenezer, Georgia to escape persecution in the Archbishopric of Salzburg and other Roman Catholic authorities for their religious views.

== Background ==
Boltzius was born at Forst in Lower Lusatia, a town southeast of Berlin, Germany. His parents, Eva Rosina Muller and Martin Boltzius worked as weavers. He was awarded a scholarship for theology from the University of Halle. During his time at the university, he studied Lutheran Pietism, which emphasized salvation by grace, strong ethics, vigorous pastoral leadership, and social compassion. Upon completing his studies, he served as the inspector at the Latin School of the Francke in Halle providing Protestant education to orphans.

== Ebenezer settlement ==
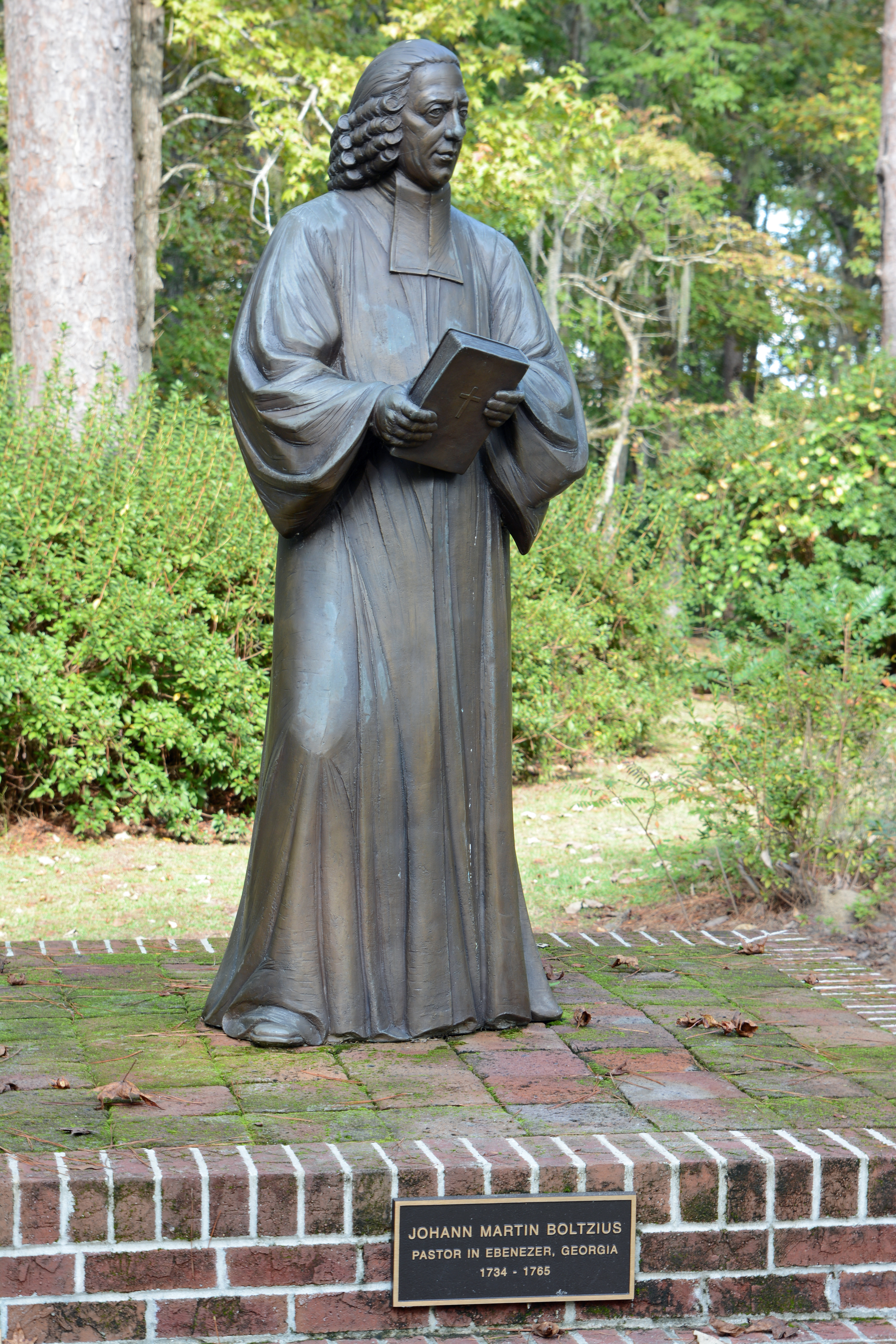
Statue in Ebenezer, Georgia, U.S.

In 1733, he was chosen by Gotthilf August Francke, son of a co-founder of the school, to serve as a minister to the Salzburg Protestant refugees. Boltzius called their journey "into danger, but closer to God", which sheds light on the harsh conditions that travelers often faced during the eighteenth century. This religiously motivated journey was seen as a chance for the Salzburgers to come closer to God by taking on these hardships in order to follow Christ and therefore, this movement was seen as a pilgrimage more than as emigration. Boltzius envisioned this new community as one where God was the ultimate authority. Although he was chosen and seen as a leader for the Salzburgers, he stressed that the ministers were governed by God and that they would make all of the administrative and disciplinary decisions in His name.

In 1734, the group of Salzburgers who sailed from England to Georgia, arriving first in Charleston, South Carolina before proceeding to Savannah, Georgia. James Oglethorpe, the founder of the Georgia colony, met them upon arrival and assigned them the piece of land that would become Ebenezer. Many of the Salzburgers died due to complications from infectious diseases during the journey, and once they arrived in Georgia. Boltzius insisted that these deaths were due to God's works and that the intervention was only a test of their faith. From his entries in the Detailed Reports of the Salzburger Emigrants Who Settled in America (Ausführliche Nachricht von den saltzburgischen Emigranten compiled by Samuel Urlsperger), there are some signals that Boltzius began to blame James Oglethorpe, as representative of the Trustees of Georgia, for the many deaths because of his poor choice of location for the settlement. In 1736, Ebenezer was moved closer to the Savannah River. Boltzius had demanded that the community be relocated to an area with more fertile land, where the Salzburgers could thrive. After an altercation with Oglethorpe, Boltzius threatened to disband the community if they did not receive permission to relocate.

In 1737, Boltzius had several conversations with John Wesley over the issue of episcopacy. Boltzius said, "Of this [doctrine] he [Wesley] feels so sure that no argument could be strong enough to sway him in the slightest from his opinion". This led to Wesley's declining to serve Boltzius Holy Communion.

Boltzius established the Jerusalem Lutheran Church and administered the settlement of Ebenezer with a strong religious element. Boltzius also wanted to share his faith with other communities in Georgia. He rejected the Moravians who came into Georgia, but he was able to form relationships with Anglican and Jewish leaders in the community. He was very outspoken when it came to his views about how political issues were affecting the colonies, and this led to his disassociation with many of the other groups in his area. He was strongly opposed to slavery because he thought that it went against Christian values, but for fear of being killed for his beliefs, in 1740 he determined that he needed to become accepting of slavery for the safety of the Salzburgers. He stated that slavery was a new way to spread Christian faith and later purchased his own slaves. In 1741, Boltzius founded what is now the Lutheran Church of the Ascension in Savannah.

Towards the end of his life, Boltzius became sick with malaria and began to lose his eyesight, possibly due to a keratitis.

When he died in 1765, the Salzburgers felt his absence, for they had lost their leader and their guide.

== See also ==
- Ebenezer, Georgia
- Salzburger emigrants
- John A. Treutlen
- Salzburg Protestants
- Philipp Georg Friedrich von Reck
- Samuel Urlsperger
- Georgia Salzburger Society

== Other sources ==
- Boltzius, Johann Martin (1750) Reliable Answer to Some Submitted Questions Concerning the Land Carolina (The William and Mary Quarterly, 14. April 1957, pg. 257–59)

== Related reading ==
- Jones, George Fenwick (1984) The Salzburger Saga: Religious Exiles and Other Germans along the Savannah (Athens: University of Georgia Press) ISBN 9780820306896
