= Georgia Salzburger Society =

- Ebenezer Townsite and Jerusalem Lutheran Church
- U.S. National Register of Historic Places
- U.S. Historic district
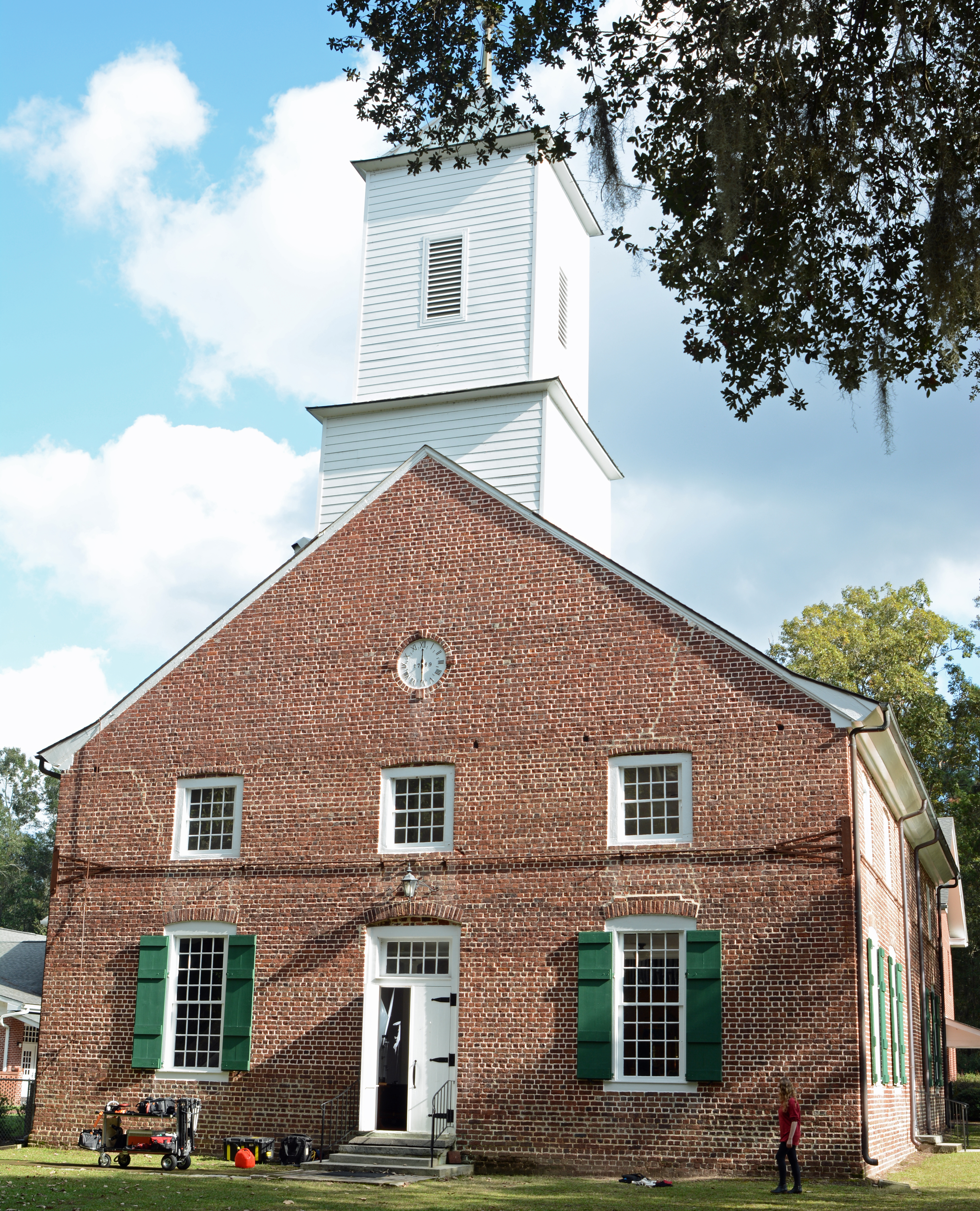
- Jerusalem Lutheran Church

- Location within Georgia
- Location: Effingham County, Georgia
- Nearest city: Rincon, Georgia / Springfield, Georgia
- Coordinates: 32.376667°N 81.180833°W
- Built: 1767
- NRHP reference No.: 74000674
- Added to NRHP: December 4, 1974

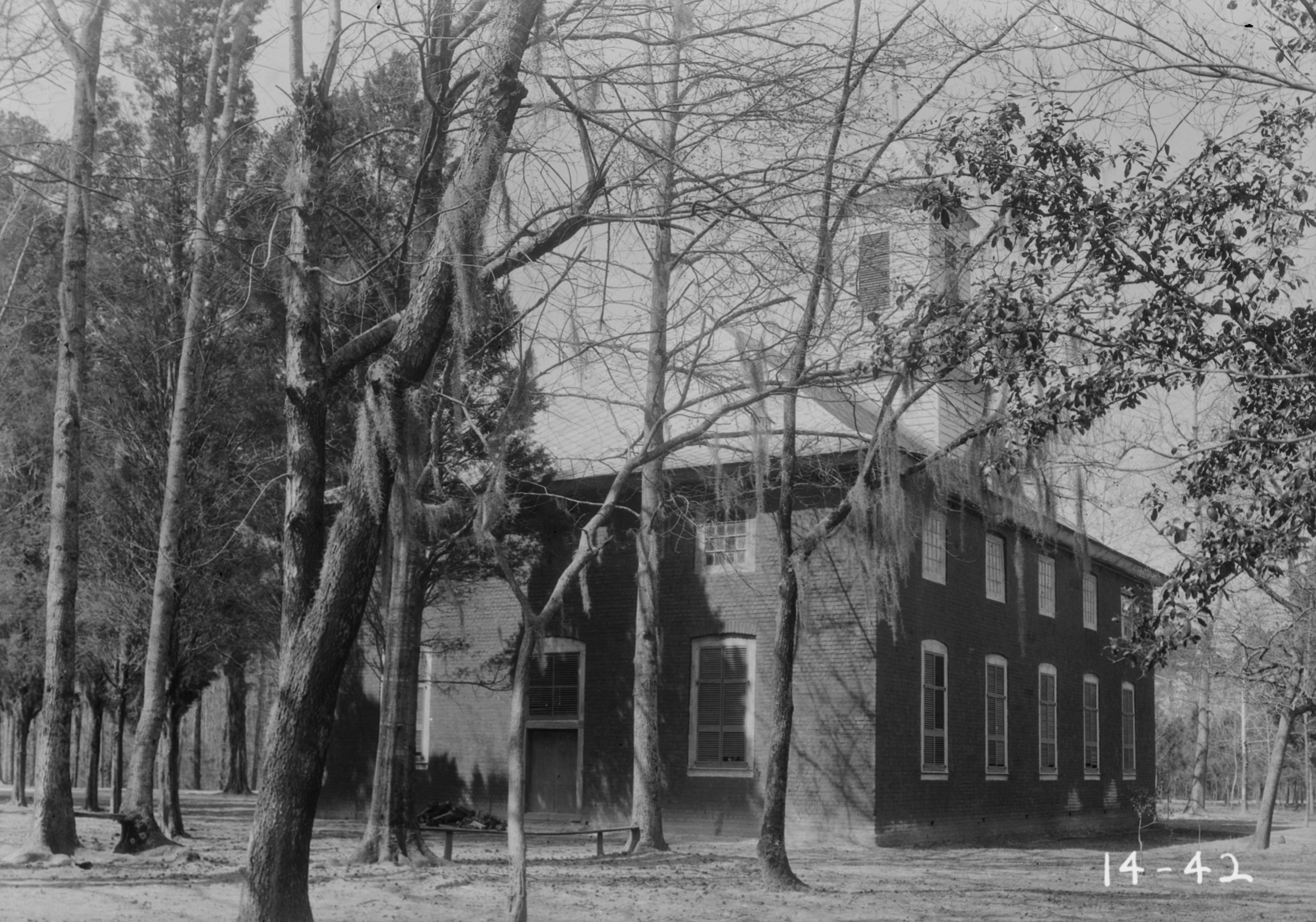
Church

The Georgia Salzburger Society, headquartered in historic Ebenezer, Georgia, celebrates the history and heritage of the Georgia Salzburgers who emigrated and settled in Old Ebenezer and New Ebenezer. It was established in 1925 as an independently operating genealogical and archaeological organization

The Society operates a research library and a living history museum housing an extensive collection of artifacts. The museum is built on the site of the Ebenezer Orphanage, the first orphanage in the state of Georgia (1737).

As of 2019, the Georgia Salzburger Society has over 1,700 members throughout the United States, as well as some international members.

== Notable members ==
- Jane Grier Durden, schoolteacher and lineage society leader

== See also ==
- Johann Martin Boltzius
- John A. Treutlen
