= Saintsbury =

Saintsbury is a surname. Notable people with the surname include:

- George Saintsbury (1845–1933), English writer, literary historian, scholar, critic, and wine connoisseur
- Harry Arthur Saintsbury, or H. A. Saintsbury (1869–1939), English actor and playwright
- Kathleen Saintsbury (1899–1995), English actress

== See also ==
- Sainsbury (disambiguation)
