= George Salisbury =

George Salisbury may refer to:

- George Salisbury (governor), U.S. Navy officer and Naval Governor of Guam
- George Salisbury (director) (born 1972), film and music video director and graphic designer
- George Salisbury (javelin thrower) (born 1918), 3rd in the javelin throw at the 1946 USA Outdoor Track and Field Championships

== See also ==
- George Salusbury (fl. 1545), Welsh politician
