= Jane Grier Durden =

American civic leader and historian

President General of the United Daughters of the Confederacy
- In office 2008–2010
- Preceded by: Janice K. Langford
- Succeeded by: Martha Rogers Van Schaick

Personal details
- Born: Swainsboro, Georgia, U.S.
- Spouse: Homer Sylvester Durden III
- Education: Georgia Southern University
- Occupation: schoolteacher

Grace Jane Grier Durden is an American civic leader, historian, and retired teacher who served as president general of the United Daughters of the Confederacy from 2008 to 2010.

== Early life and education ==
Durden is from Swainsboro, Georgia. She has a sister, Jill. She graduated from Swainsboro High School and earned a bachelor's degree in education and a master's degree in education from Georgia Southern University.

== Career ==
Durden worked as a schoolteacher in Emanuel County public schools for thirty years before she retired in 2003.

=== Civic work ===
In the 1970s, Durden became involved in genealogy and historic preservation. She joined the Daughters of the American Colonists, the Daughters of the American Revolution (DAR), the United Daughters of the Confederacy (UDC), the National Gavel Society, the Georgia Salzburger Society, the First Families of Georgia, the Sons and Daughters of the Pilgrims, and the Sons and Daughters of the Colonial and Antebellum Bench and Bar 1565—1861.

She served as governor general of the First Families of Georgia and as the governor general of the Sons and Daughters of the Pilgrims. From 2008 to 2010, she served as president general of the UDC. The UDC named the Jane Grier Durden Award, given to chapters for awarding the most national defense medals, in her honor. In 2019, Darden served as regent of the Gov. David Emanuel-Adam Brinson DAR Chapter.

She also served as president of the Kiwanis Club of Swainsboro and is a charter member of the National Society Sons and Daughters of Antebellum Planters 1607—1861.

In 2019, she served as the keynote speaker at a Memorial Day service hosted by American Legion Dexter Allen Post 90 at the Emma Kelly Theater in Statesboro, Georgia.

== Personal life ==
She was married to Homer Sylvester Durden III, who died in 2020.
