= Salisbury station =

Salisbury station or Salisbury railway station may refer to:

- Salisbury railway station, in Salisbury, Wiltshire, England
- Salisbury railway station, Adelaide, in South Australia
- Salisbury railway station, Brisbane, in Queensland, Australia
- Salisbury station (North Carolina), an Amtrak station in Salisbury, North Carolina
- Union Station (Salisbury, Maryland), a former train station in the United States

== See also ==
- Salisbury (disambiguation)
