= Salzberg =

Salzberg may refer to:

- Bochnia, Sivac
- Praid, Harghita County, Romania
- Salzberg, a formerly independent municipality in Bavaria, now part of Berchtesgaden
- Salzberg, a district of Neuenstein, Hesse, Germany

== People with the surname ==
- Barry Salzberg (born 1953), American businessman, accountant, and lawyer
- Sharon Salzberg (born 1952), American author and Buddhist meditation teacher

== See also ==
- Salzburg (disambiguation)
- Salsburg (disambiguation)
- Saltzberg (disambiguation)
