= Sansbury =

Sansbury is a surname. Notable people with the surname include:

- Eddie Sansbury (born 1983), Australian rules footballer
- Kenneth Sansbury (1905–1993), British Anglican bishop
- Tauto Sansbury (1949–2019), Australian activist

== See also ==
- Sainsbury (disambiguation)
