= Salzburg (disambiguation) =

Salzburg is a city in Austria.

Salzburg may also refer to:

== Places ==
=== Austria ===
- Salzburg (federal state), an Austrian federal state
- Duchy of Salzburg
- Archbishopric of Salzburg, 1278 – 1803
- Hohensalzburg Fortress in Salzburg, Austria

=== Germany ===
- Salzburg Castle, in Franconia, Germany
- Salzburg, Germany, a municipality in Rhineland-Palatinate, Germany
- A part of Neufahrn in Niederbayern in Bavaria, Germany

=== Other places ===
- Ocna Sibiului, Romania
- Château-Salins, France

== Other uses ==
- FC Red Bull Salzburg, an Austrian football club based in Wals-Siezenheim
- Salzburg Protestants, exiled in the 1700s
- Salzburger emigrants to Georgia, now in the USA
- Honduras Salzburg, a Honduran football club

== See also ==
- Salzberg (disambiguation)
- Saltzberg, a surname
- Saltsburg, Pennsylvania
