= Vernonburg, Georgia =

- Town
- Location in Chatham County and the state of Georgia
- Coordinates: 31°58′2″N 81°7′15″W
- Country: United States
- State: Georgia
- County: Chatham

Area
  - Total: 0.41 sq mi (1.07 km^{2})
  - Land: 0.40 sq mi (1.04 km^{2})
  - Water: 0.012 sq mi (0.03 km^{2})
- Elevation: 7 ft (2.1 m)

Population (2020)
  - Total: 139
  - Density: 344.8/sq mi (133.11/km^{2})
- Time zone: UTC-5 (Eastern (EST))
  - Summer (DST): UTC-4 (EDT)
- ZIP code: 31419
- Area code: 912
- FIPS code: 13-79164
- GNIS feature ID: 0333326

Vernonburg is a town in Chatham County, Georgia, United States, about 10 miles south of downtown Savannah. It is located at a sharp curve along the Vernon River, a tidal creek. The population was 139 at the 2020 census.

Vernonburg is part of the Savannah metropolitan statistical area.

== History ==
The Georgia General Assembly incorporated Vernonburg in 1866. The community was named after James Vernon, who is credited with bringing the Salzburger emigrants to Georgia.

== Geography ==
Vernonburg is located at 31°58′2″N 81°7′14″W (31.967361, -81.12073).

According to the United States Census Bureau, the town has a total area of 0.4 square mile (1.0 km^{2}), of which 0.4 square mile (0.9 km^{2}) is land and 2.70% is water. Vernonburg consists mainly of a small stretch of riverfront properties along a section of the Vernon River.

== Demographics ==
Historical population
Census	Pop.	Note	%±
1960	65		—
1970	136		109.2%
1980	178		30.9%
1990	74		−58.4%
2000	138		86.5%
2010	122		−11.6%
2020	139		13.9%
U.S. Decennial Census

As of the census of 2010, there were 122 people, 59 households, and 47 families residing in the town. The population density was 310/sq mi (118/km^{2}). There were 69 housing units at an average density of 173/sq mi (67/km^{2}). The racial makeup of the town was 98.4% White, and 1.6% Asian.

There were 52 households, out of which 25.0% had children under the age of 18 living with them, 71.2% were married couples living together, 5.8% had a female householder with no husband present, and 19.2% were non-families. 19.2% of all households were made up of individuals, and 13.5% had someone living alone who was 65 years of age or older. The average household size was 2.35 and the average family size was 2.67.

In the town, the population was spread out, with 21.3% under the age of 18, 4.1% from 18 to 24, 16.4% from 25 to 44, 33.6% from 45 to 64, and 24.6% who were 65 years of age or older. The median age was 51.0 years. For every 100 females, there were 87.7 males.

The median income for a household in the town was $74,375, and the median income for a family was $158,125. Males had a median income of $161,667 versus $150,313 for females. The per capita income for the town was $91,121. 4.6% of the population and none of the families were below the poverty line.

== Gallery ==
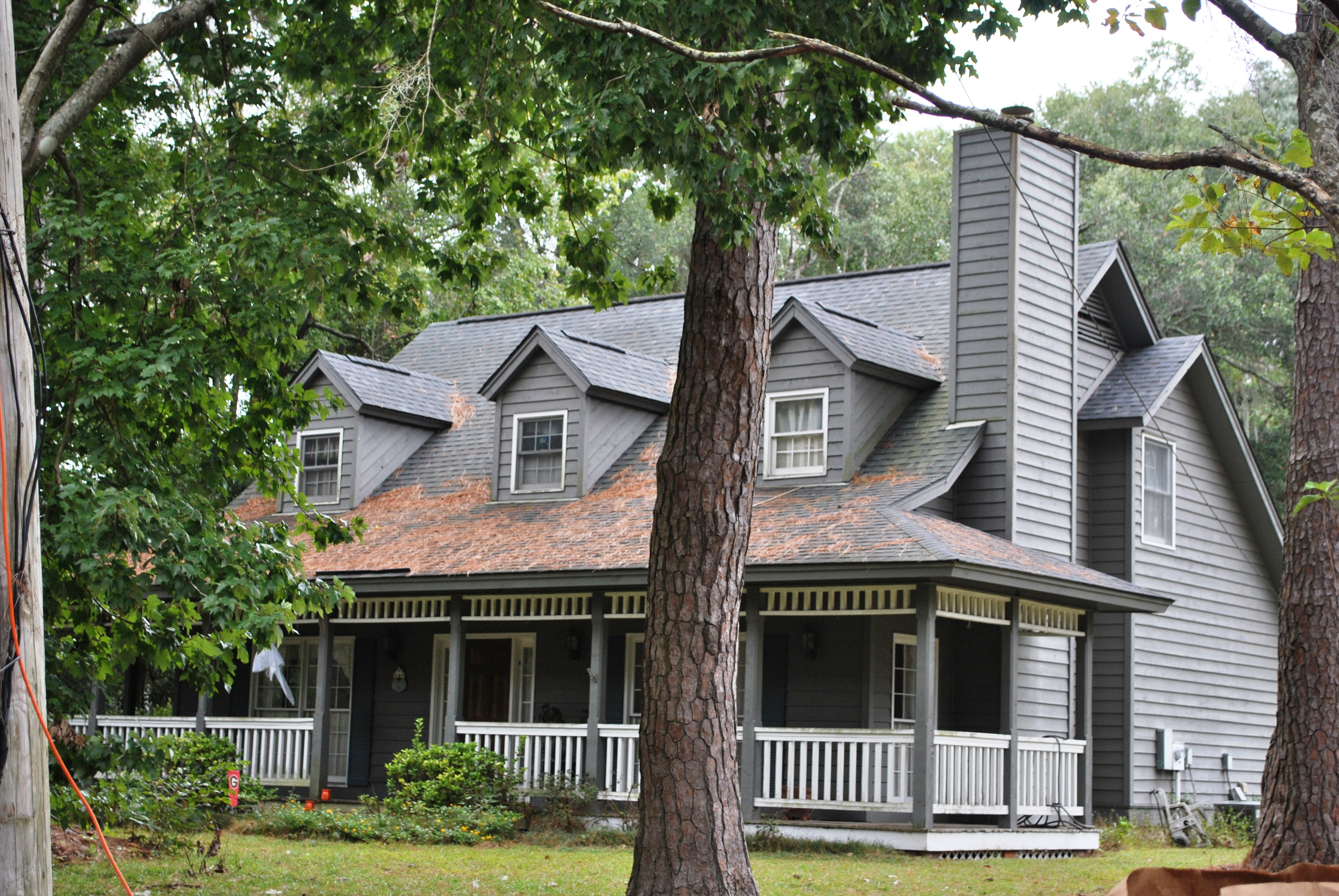
Vernonburg Historic District

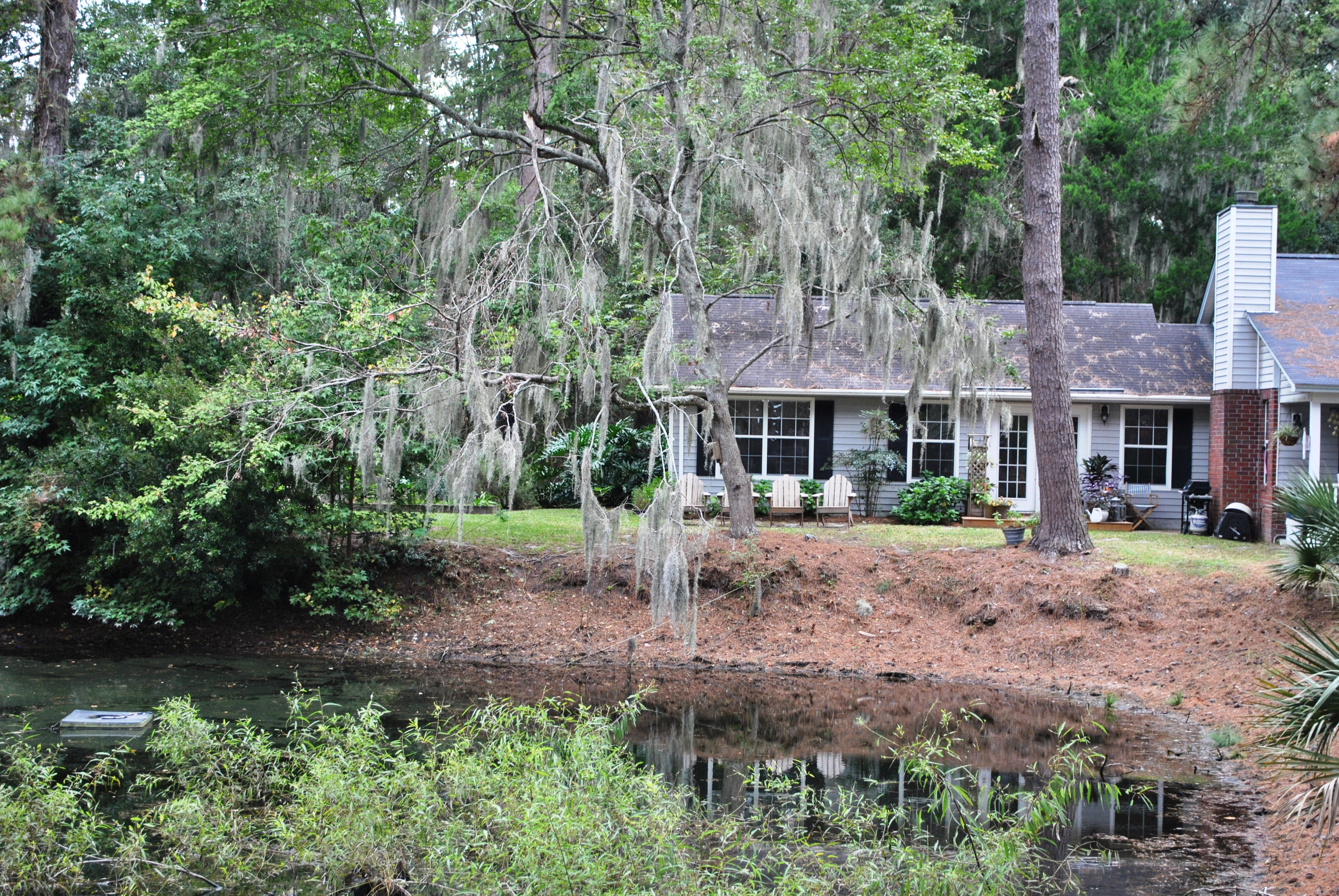
Vernonburg Historic District

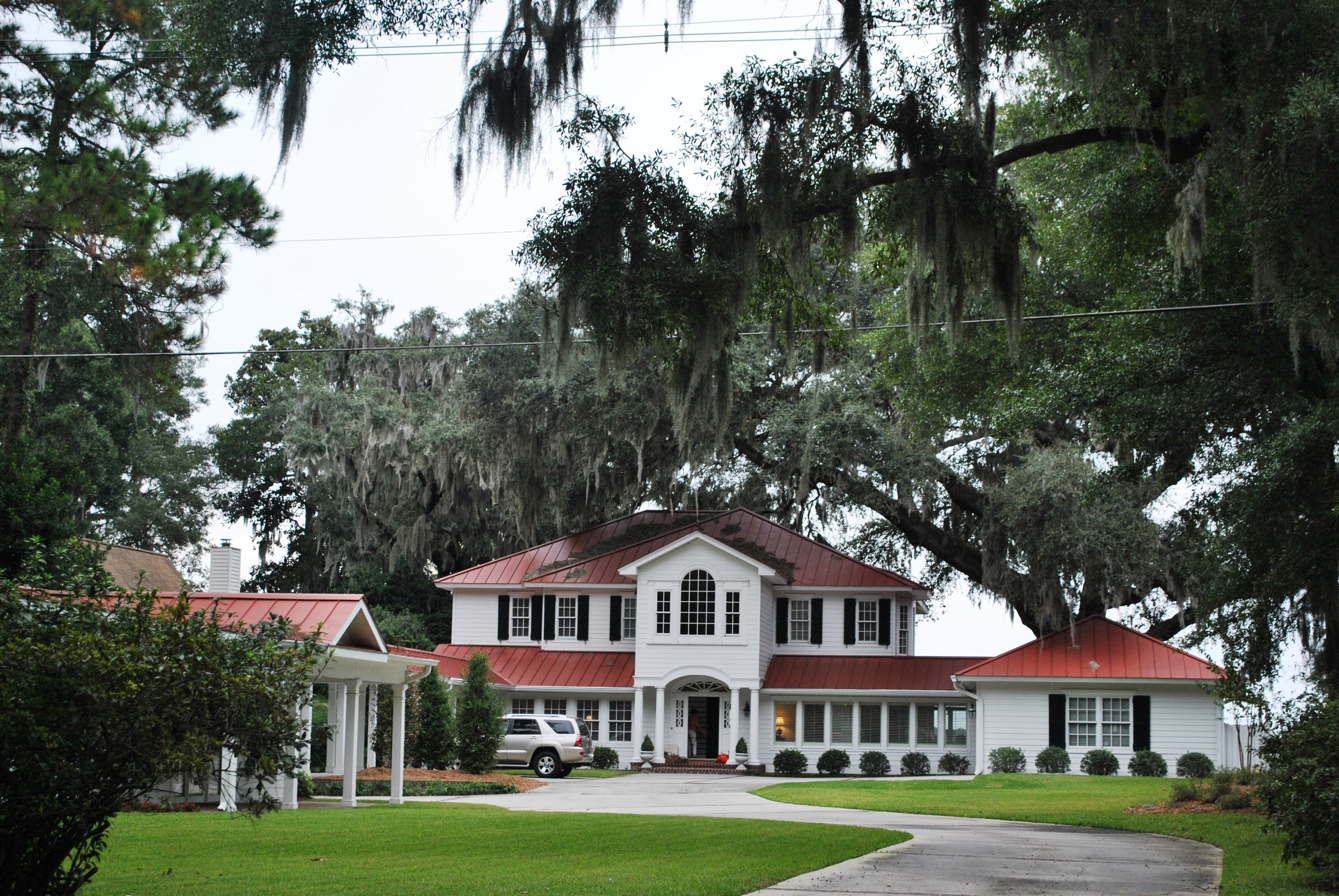
Vernonburg Historic District

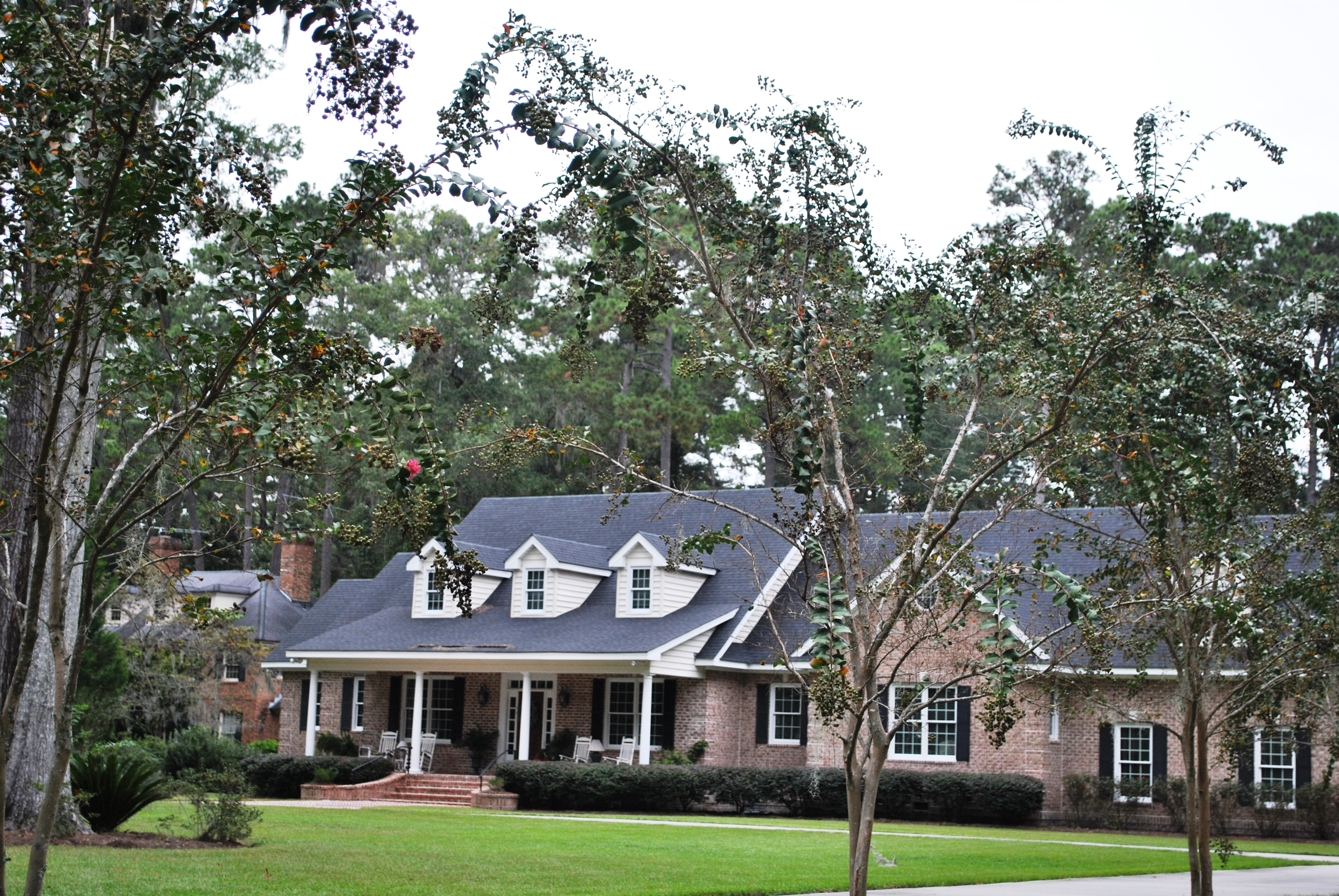
Vernonburg Historic District

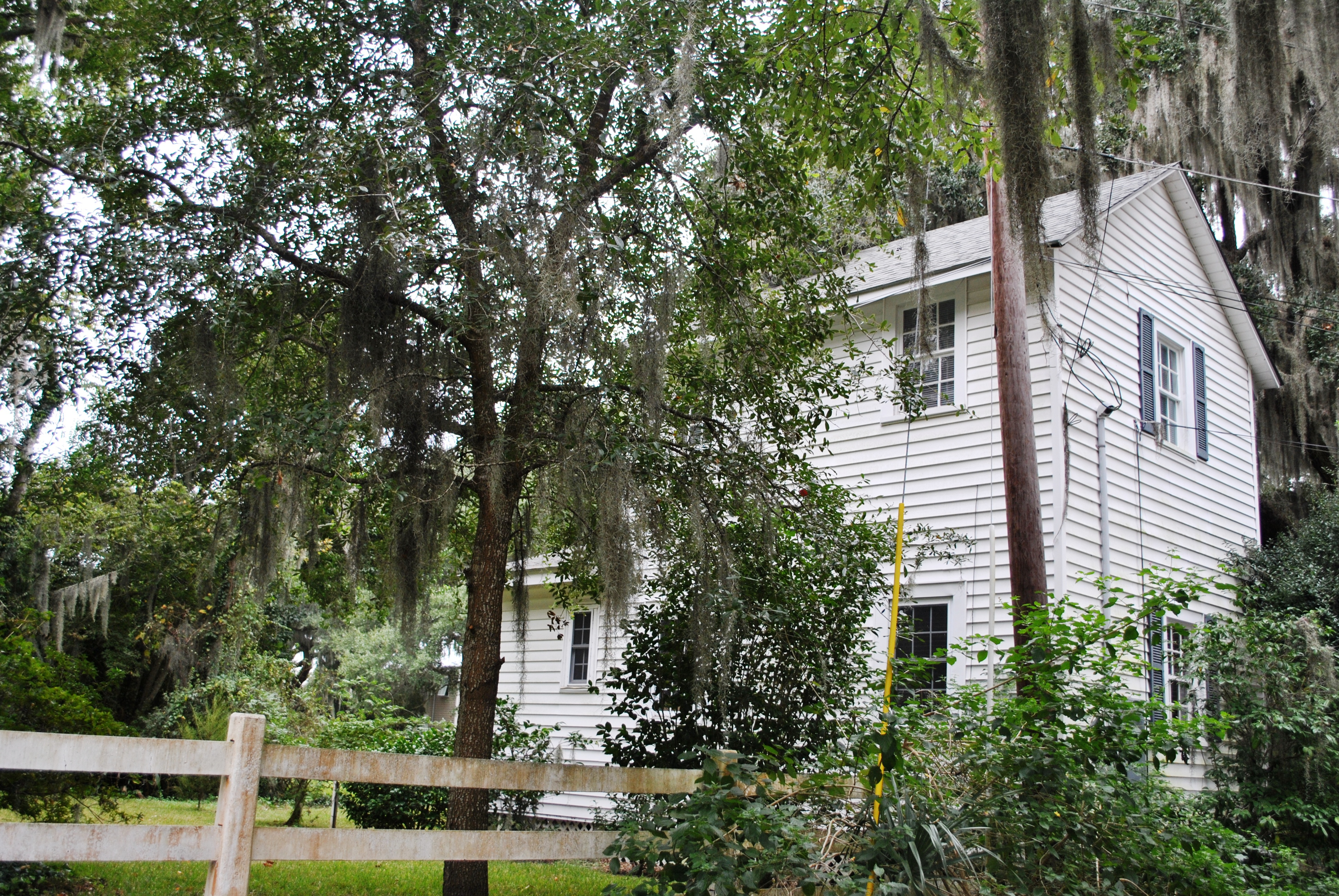
Vernonburg Historic District

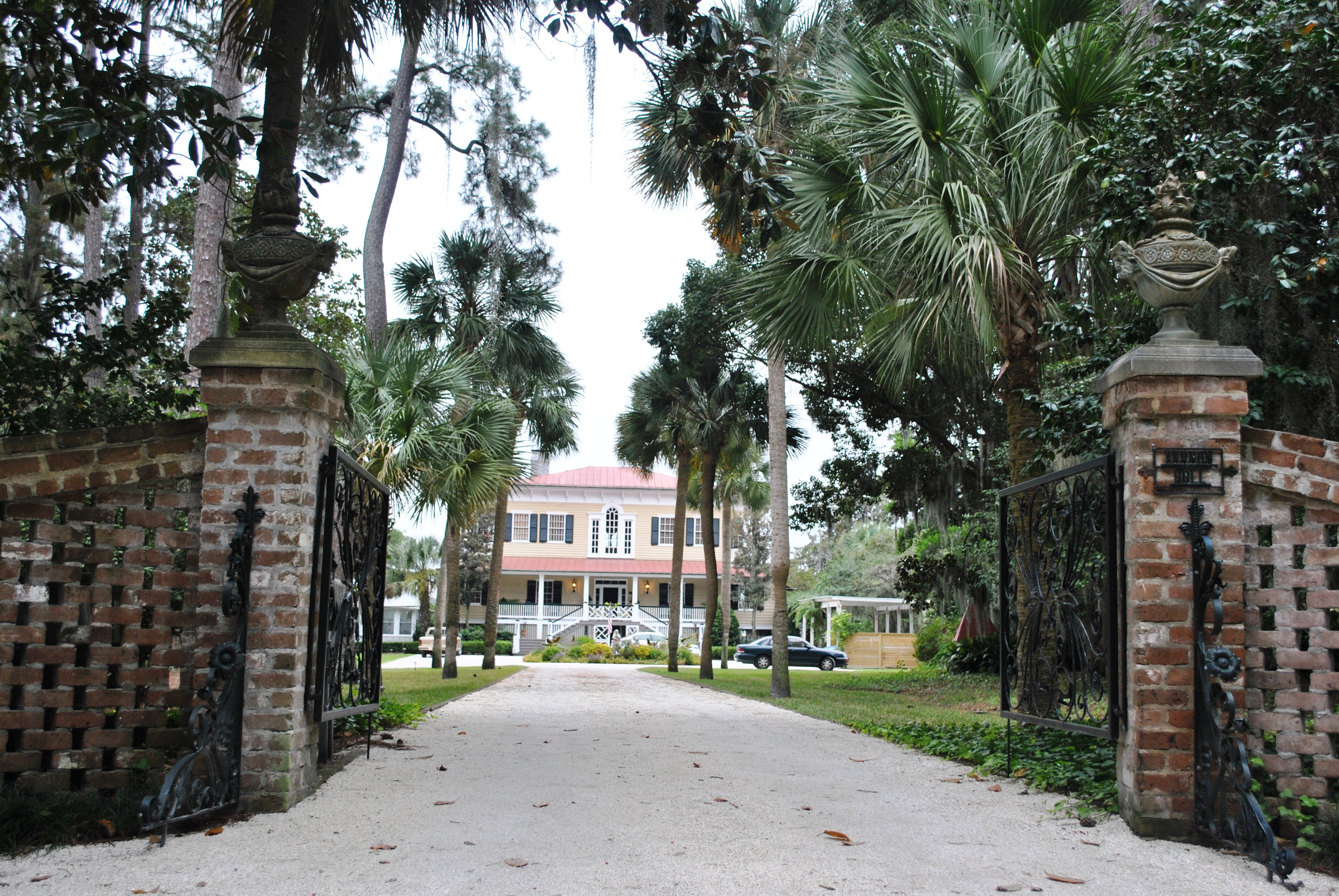
Vernonburg Historic District
