= Kürnbach =

- Municipality
- Coat of arms

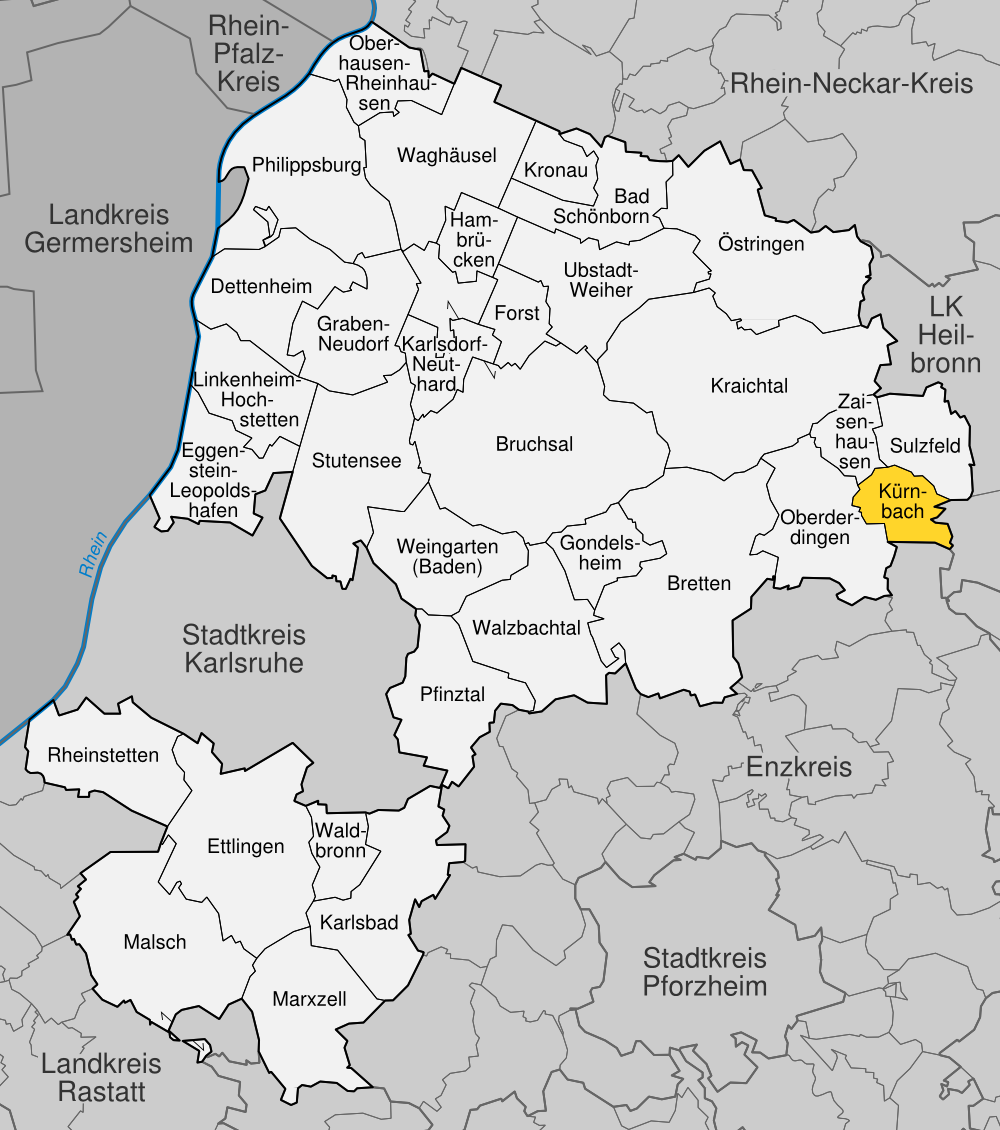
- Location of Kürnbach within Karlsruhe district
- Interactive map of Kürnbach
- Location within Germany Location within Baden-Württemberg
- Coordinates: 49°04′37″N 08°50′39″E
- Country: Germany
- State: Baden-Württemberg
- Admin. region: Karlsruhe
- District: Karlsruhe

Government
  - Mayor (2024–32): Moritz Baumann

Area
  - Total: 12.67 km^{2} (4.89 sq mi)
- Elevation: 213 m (699 ft)

Population (2025-12-31)
  - Total: 2,463
  - Density: 194.4/km^{2} (503.5/sq mi)
- Time zone: UTC+01:00 (CET)
  - Summer (DST): UTC+02:00 (CEST)
- Postal codes: 75057
- Dialling codes: 07258
- Vehicle registration: KA
- Website: www.kuernbach.de

Kürnbach (German pronunciation: [ˈkyʁnˌbax]) is a municipality in the district of Karlsruhe in southwestern Baden-Württemberg. This historic wine village features half timbered houses and lies around 60 kilometers northwest of Stuttgart. The village was once owned by two states and governed by three administrations, making it a constitutional rarity in Germany. Today it is known for its Schwarzriesling, or Black Riesling, which is actually a type of Pinot Noir.

== Geography ==
=== Location ===
The historic wine village of Kürnbach, known as the Black Riesling village in the Kraichgau hill country, is one of the few communities in Germany with a history of shared governance. It is located in the northwestern Stromberg-Heuchelberg Nature Park near Zabergäu in the valley Humsterbaches. The Humsterbach was dammed as a retention basin east of the village next to Schlosswiesensee. To the west, the landscape opens up to the typical cultivated hill country of Kraichgau, while to the east a large contiguous forest area of Stromberg-Heuchelberg nature park begins.

=== Constituent communities ===
The municipality of Kürnbach includes the Aussiedlerhöfe Heiligenäcker and the estates of Humstermühle, Klostermühe, and Rohrmühle.

== History ==
=== Middle Ages ===
In the time of Charlemagne there already stood a wooden church in Kürnbach, which was later replaced by a Romanesque stone building. The oldest surviving reference to Kürnbach dates back to 1278. It is a goods list of the monastery of Weissenburg. The document indicates that Kürnbach was already in the possession of the Benedictine monastery. About 100 years later, the name of a noble family of Kürnbach appears for the first time. In 1543 Kürnbach got the market right.

=== Condominium ===
The homeland poet Samuel Friedrich Sauter referred to Kürnbach as "... this market town of two states, divided into Hesse and Baden…". Thus the condominium Kürnbach offers a constitutional rarity. Two-thirds of the town belonged to the county Hesse and one-third to the Duchy of Württemberg (and from 1810 to the Grand Duchy of Baden). The village was divided into two states but had no border. Nationality was assigned based on specific inhabited houses, which means that a resident's citizenship could change with the purchase of a particular house.

Around 1300, two-thirds of Kürnbach became a fief of the Counts of Katzenlnbogen. Engelhard von Liebenstein pledged the other part of the village to the Duchy of Württemberg in 1320. In 1479, the Counts of Katzenlnbogen were inherited by the Landgraves of Hesse. Kürnbach now belonged two-thirds to the county Hesse and one-third to the Duchy of Württemberg, forming a condominium. Individual cultivated land was assigned to one of the two dominions but could change these as well. Therefore, there were three different administrations, pertaining respectively to Hesse, Württemberg (later Baden) and the condominium as a whole.

After the fractional division of land, the Hessian proportion came to the county Hesse-Darmstadt. With the peace of Schönbrunn, the Württemberg proportion came to the Grand Duchy of Baden. Kürnbach formed an enclave in Baden state territory and bordered the rest of the Kingdom of Württemberg. In 1835, a separate municipal code was issued. There were two mayors elected for a six-year term, and each mayor chaired the council for three years and ran his own registry office.

Three municipal calculations had to be conducted: one Baden, one Hessian and one for the condominium, with two different financial years on two different legal bases. The residents of Kürnbach profited from this, because they paid less than "true" Badeners or Hesse. In addition, during the 19th century, Hesse consistently resisted ceding rights in Kürnbach to Baden.

After the founding of the Reich in 1871 and the subsequent legal unification, the constitutional construct Kürnbach in fact appeared more abstruse and the privileges of the "tax haven" were reduced. Despite Kürnbachers' resistance, a state treaty between the two states was concluded on May 11, 1903, in Heidelberg. It was determined that Kürnbach would belong to the Grand Duchy of Baden from 1 January 1905. In exchange, the Grand Duchy of Hesse received the enclave Michelbuch and almost 300 ha of Baden forest near Heddesbach.

=== Emigration to America ===
In the middle of the 19th century, the poverty rate was particularly high. In addition to poor harvests, there were many wine-losing years, which led to a wave of emigration to America.

The most famous Kürnbacher was John Adam Treutlen, who later became governor of Georgia. Other well-known emigrants are Blickensdörfer, Pfeiffer, Krämer and Weisert.

=== 20th century ===
The restoration of the village began in 1965. From this year, Kürnbach belonged first to the district office Bretten, then to the district Sinsheim, which was dissolved in 1973. Since then, the village has been assigned to the district of Karlsruhe.

== Religion ==
Since the Reformation Kürnbach is predominantly evangelical. In addition to the parish of the regional church there is also a Protestant-Methodist and a new Apostolic congregation. Roman Catholic faithful are cared by the community in Oberderdingen-Flehingen. Every religious community has its own church in the village.

== Population development ==
- 1939 1,145 inhabitants
- 1950 1,665 inhabitants
- 1970 2,130 inhabitants
- 2010 2,277 inhabitants
- 2015 2,330 inhabitants
- 2020 2,394 inhabitants

== Politics ==
=== Mayors ===
- 1905–1919 Theodor Henninger
- 1919–1933 Karl Heinrich Hauser
- 1934–1945 Otto Hauffe
- 1945–1947 Karl Heinrich Hauser
- 1947–1964 August Büchele
- 1964–1984 Kurt Böckle
- 1984–2016 Karl-Heinz Hauser
- 2016–2024 Armin Ebhart
- 2024–present Moritz Baumann

=== Regional council ===
After the local election of 2014 there are four voter communities represented in the municipal council.

- FWV (35,3 %): four seats
- Handel, Handwerk und Gewerbe (HHG) (25,1 %): three seats
- Liste 4 (26,0 %): three seats
- Liste 90 (13,7 %): two seats

== Blazon ==
The municipality Kürnbach leads as a coat of arms a standing in red silver eagle claw.

== Partnerships ==
Since 1983 Kürnbach has a partnership with the community Ziersdorf in Austria.

== Economy and infrastructure ==
=== Education ===
Kürnbach has its own elementary school and two kindergartens.

== Culture and sights ==
=== Historic center ===
In the historic center there are numerous half-timbered buildings of different eras, such as the Hessen-Kelter, the Deutschherrenhaus, which was once a supply situation for the Teutonic Order, or the moated castle, which was built from a previous moated castle. In 1266 the castle was owned by the Lords of Liebenstein. From 1380 were knights of Balzhofen and after the knights of Sternenfels on castle Kürnbach. Until the mid-19th century the castle was a family property of the Grand Dukes of Hesse, then the property was privately owned. The castle is surrounded by greenery and at the former Upper Gate houses there is the old town hall and the old schoolhouse.

=== Church ===
In Kürnbach stood around 800 a wooden church which was later replaced by a Romanesque stone building and is now known as the Protestant Michael's Church. It received the present look through the reconstruction (1721 – 1725) after the building was destroyed in the Thirty Years 'War. Among the art treasures of the church include the choir vault; the crucifix from the 16th century, which is created with sandstone; five-meter-high Renaissance tomb for Bernhard von Sternenfels and his wife Maria Agatha von Weitershausen and the organ, which was built in 1834 by the Heidelberg organ builder Wilhelm Jacob Overmann.

=== Museums ===
The Historic Actien Museum, housed in a historic peasant estate near the Upper Gate, has been showing historic securities since 1976.

=== Personalities ===
- Kurt Böckle (1922–1993); mayor from 1964 to 1984, honorary citizen to leave office
- Friederike Louise Löffler (1744–1805); pharmacist's daughter and well-known cookbook author, born in Kürnbach, mother of Henriette Löffler, also known as a cookbook author
- Friederike Hauffe (1801–1829); the "seer of Prevorst", lived from 1821 to 1826 in Kürnbach
- John A. Treutlen (1734–1782); American politician and from 1777 to 1782 governor of the US state of Georgia
