= Salzburg Protestants =

Exile of Protestant Salzburgers (1731–1732)

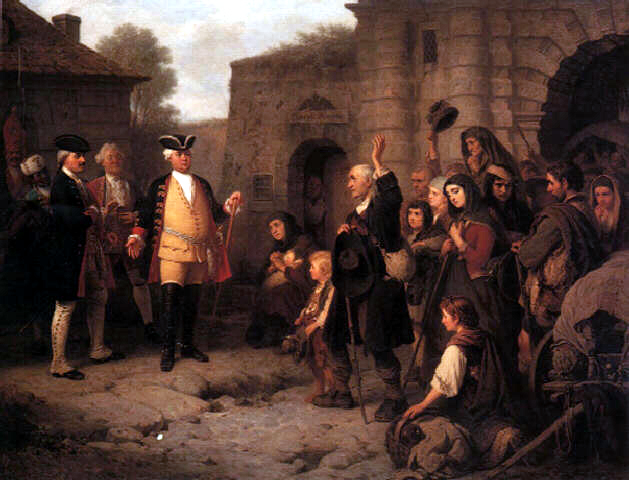
King Frederick William I of Prussia welcomes the Salzburg Protestants, 19th century painting

The Salzburg Protestants (German: Salzburger Exulanten) were Protestant refugees who had lived in the Catholic Archbishopric of Salzburg until the 18th century. In a series of persecutions ending in 1731, over 20,000 Protestants were expelled from their homeland by the Prince-Archbishops. Their expulsion from Salzburg triggered protests from the Protestant states within the Holy Roman Empire and criticism across the rest of the Protestant world, and the King in Prussia offered to resettle them in his territory. The majority of the Salzburg Protestants accepted the Prussian offer and traveled the length of Germany to reach their new homes in Prussian Lithuania. The rest scattered to other Protestant states in Europe and the British colonies in America.

== Background ==
The prince-Archbishopric of Salzburg was an ecclesiastical state within the Holy Roman Empire. The official religion was Roman Catholicism, and the state was ruled by a Prince-Archbishop. However, Lutheranism had gained a toehold in Salzburg, mostly in the Alpine mountains and valleys outside the city. In the early 16th century, Lutheran ideas quickly spread throughout the Salzburg lands along with miners recruited from Saxony by Archbishop Matthias Lang von Wellenburg (d. 1540). The mountain peasants were also in the habit of seeking seasonal work elsewhere in Germany, where they came into contact with the ideas of the Protestant Reformation. Literacy was widespread, and many Salzburgers owned Protestant books that had been brought in by travelers.

Counter-Reformation measures were already taken by Wellenburg himself, but also by his successors, such as Wolf Dietrich Raitenau and Mark Sittich von Hohenems. Under the terms of the 1555 Peace of Augsburg signed by Emperor Charles V, the principle of Cuius regio, eius religio applied within the Empire. The ruler of each state could determine which religion could be practiced publicly in his territory. Dissenters only had the right to practice their religion privately or move to another state where it was the official religion. A three-year grace period was granted to sell off property and wind up one's financial affairs before emigrating.

== Defereggen Valley expulsion ==
In 1684, Prince-Archbishop Max Gandolph von Küenburg decided to expel the Protestants living in the remote Defereggen Valley, after receiving complaints from Matrei that a seller of Catholic tokens had been mistreated. The Deferegger Protestants were forced to leave during winter, without the stipulated three-year grace period. All children under the age of 15 were forced to remain in Salzburg to be raised as Catholics, and the parents were taxed a portion of their possessions to pay for this Catholic education. In response, the Protestant body in the Reichstag protested that this expulsion violated both the Peace of Augsburg and the 1648 Peace of Westphalia. However, the Prince-Archbishop insisted that the expelees were not true Protestants, but rather heretics who were not entitled to the protections given to Protestants under the treaty.

Contemporary documents capture the expulsion of 621 adults and 289 children from the Defereggen Valley. After five years of wrangling, Emperor Leopold I intervened and instructed Kuenburg's successor, Archbishop Johann Ernst von Thun, to give the children the choice of joining their parents in exile. However, only fourteen of them accepted this offer.

== Final expulsion in 1731 ==
In 1731, Prince-Archbishop Leopold Anton von Firmian decided to expel all remaining Protestants living in Salzburg. The expulsion edict was issued on 31 October 1731, the 214th anniversary of the start of the Protestant Reformation. Modeled after the Deferegger expulsion, von Firmian's edict ordered Protestants to leave Salzburg within eight days, leaving behind all children under the age of 12. Single men and women without land holdings were rounded up in November by Austrian troops and escorted out of Salzburg.

Firmian's edict clearly defeated the terms of the Peace of Westphalia. Bowing to pressure from the Protestant estates, the archbishop modified the order to allow families to stay until 23 April 1732 and to retain their property for three years.

Before the expulsion order had been issued, the Salzburg Protestants had dispatched delegations to seek help from Protestant princes within the Empire. In August 1731, a delegation set out for Regensburg to seek help from the Protestant body in the Imperial Diet. Another delegation reached Berlin in November 1731, where they were questioned by the Prussian authorities on matters of religious doctrine. The Prussian government subsequently declared that the Salzburgers were bona fide Lutherans who were entitled to the protection of the Peace of Augsburg.

=== Emigration to Prussia ===
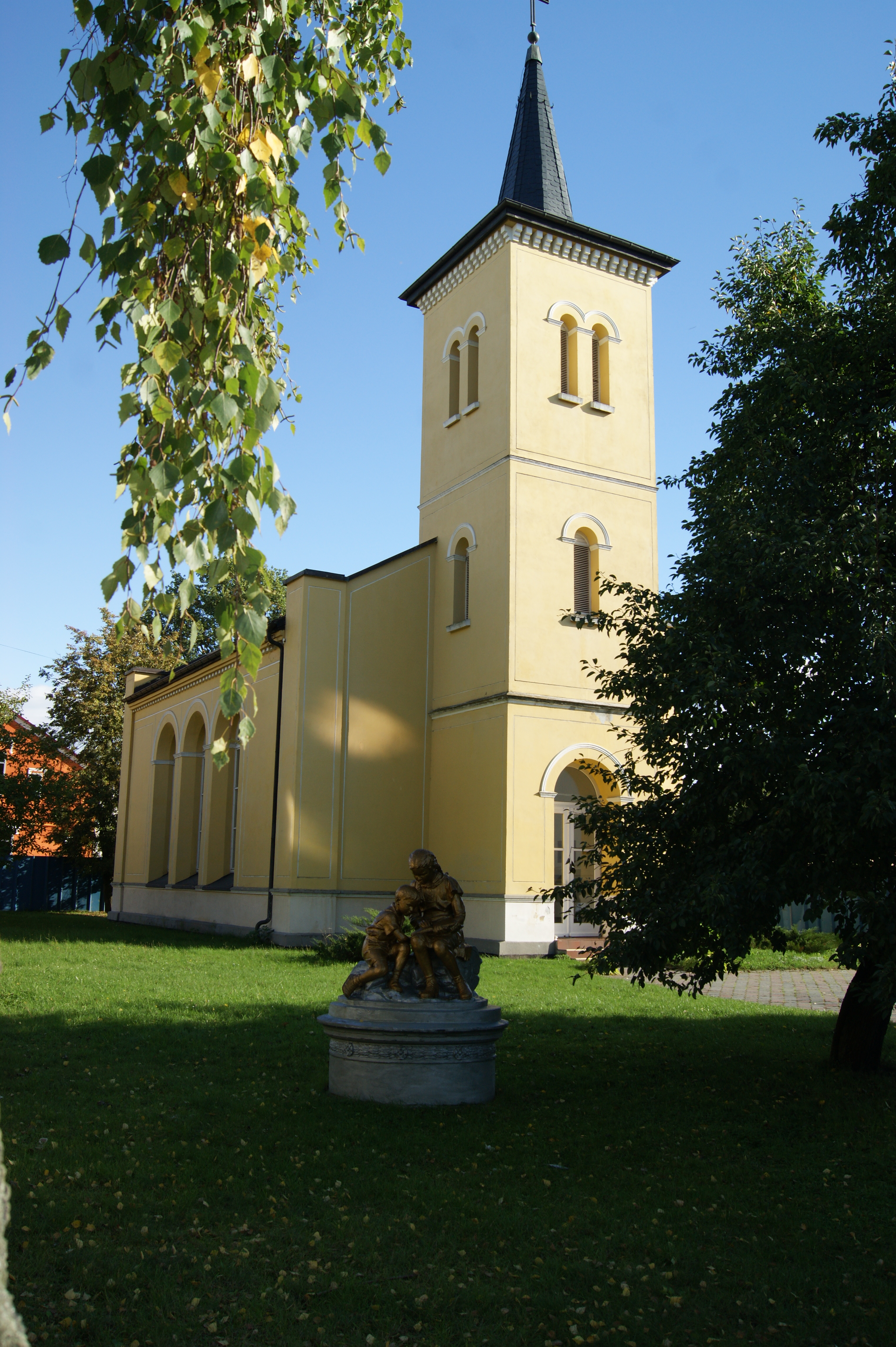
Salzburg Protestant Church, Gusev

King Frederick William I in Prussia saw an opportunity to resettle the Salzburg Protestants in his East Prussian territories, which had been depopulated by an outbreak of plague some years before. On 2 February 1732 the King issued a Patent of Invitation, declaring the Salzburg Protestants to be Prussian subjects traveling under his protection. Prussian commissioners were sent to Salzburg to arrange for transportation. Upon arrival in Prussia, the Salzburgers would be given free land, supplies, and a period of tax exemption, as laid out in the 1724 proclamation of colonization. However, the Patent did not mention the three-year grace period, as the king wished to complete the population transfer as quickly as possible. Anticipating the arrival of the Salzburgers, Frederick William expelled Mennonites already living in the area who refused military service. The king also threatened to retaliate against Catholics living in Prussia if the Salzburgers were mistreated.

Emperor Charles VI, who needed the support of the Protestant states to secure the Austrian succession, wrote a personal letter to von Firmian, asking him to comply with the Peace of Augsburg by allowing the Protestants to leave under reasonable terms and even to remain for three years if they wished. Diplomatic pressure was also exerted on the Habsburg emperor by the Netherlands and Great Britain. However, the British were reluctant to press too hard, lest the Austrians respond by demanding better treatment for Catholics in Ireland.

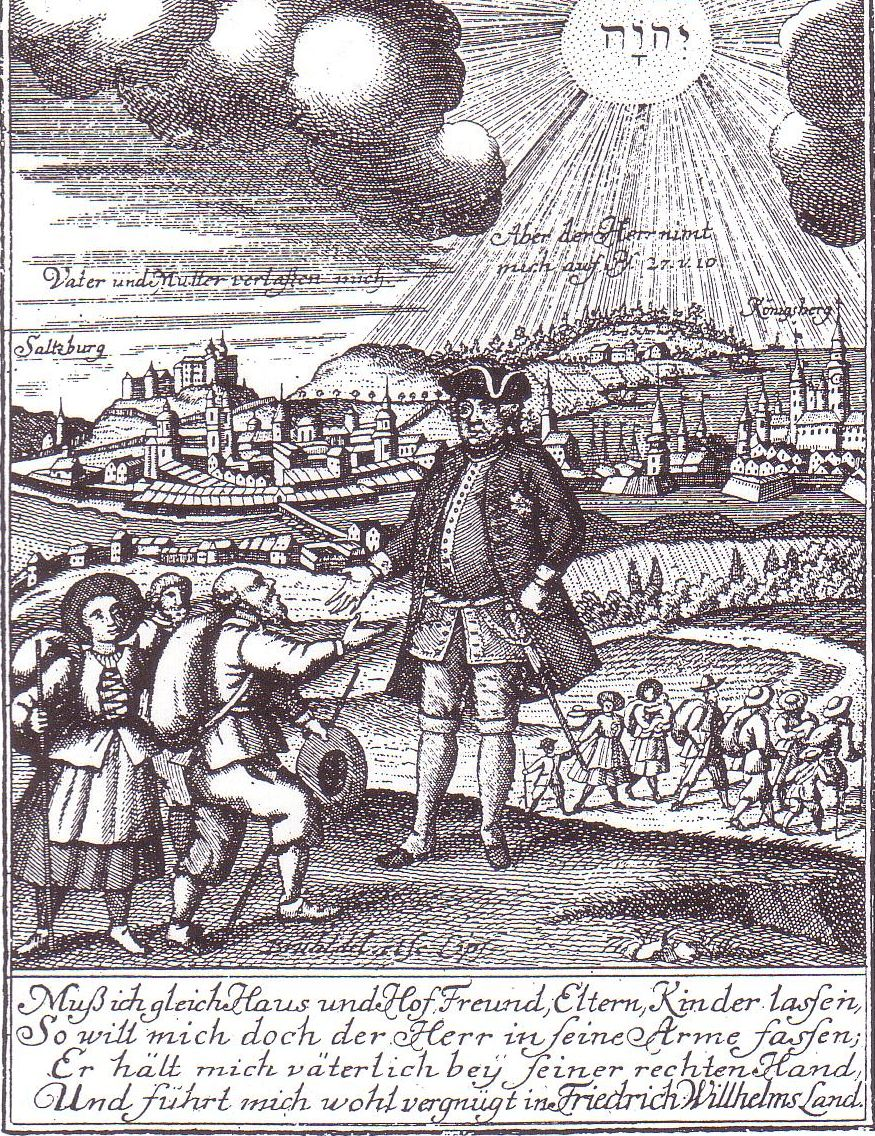
King Friedrich Wilhelm I welcoming the Salzburgers to Prussia

Between April and August 1732, over 20,000 Protestants left Salzburg for Prussia, traveling in twenty-six columns of about 800 emigrants each. The Salzburg Protestants were assessed an emigration tax of 10% of their belongings, which they paid upon departure. Among these assets was about 800,000 Prussian thalers in cash. The emigrants were received by Prussian commissioners, who supplied them with travel money. The migration became a spectacle in the Protestant towns of Germany, whose residents plied the Salzburgers with food and money as they passed through. Several hundred Salzburgers died in the trek across Germany.

The first Salzburg Protestants reached Königsberg on 28 May 1732. About 16,000 to 17,000 arrived in East Prussia, where they were settled in the Lithuania Minor region, mainly in the area of Gumbinnen (present-day Gusev, Kaliningrad Oblast). King Frederick William I personally greeted the first group of immigrants and sang Protestant hymns with them.

=== Other destinations ===
Over 30,000 Salzburgers emigrated as a result of the expulsion edict, the majority of them settling in East Prussia. Several hundred found refuge in territories ruled by King George II of Great Britain, including the Electorate of Hanover and the British colony of Georgia, where, at the instigation of the Augsburg preacher Samuel Urlsperger, several Salzburger emigrants led by Johann Martin Boltzius founded the town of Ebenezer. About 800 Protestants, mainly miners from Dürrnberg, emigrated to the Dutch Republic, where some of them settled around Cadzand.

== Aftermath ==
The expulsion of the Salzburg Protestants created a sensation in the Protestant states of Europe. At least 300 different books and pamphlets were written about the migration in 1732–1733, celebrating the faith and perseverance of the Salzburgers. Later, Goethe's poem Hermann and Dorothea would adapt a story from the Salzburg migration to the contemporary setting of the French Revolution.

Prussia dispatched Baron Erich Christoph von Plotho to Salzburg to sell the lands that the Protestants had left behind, valued at about 2.5 million Prussian thalers. He was able to sell the properties only at severely depressed prices of one-quarter to one-half the assessed value. Only a small portion of the sales price was paid in cash, and a 10% emigration tax was paid to the Archbishopric. In total, about 300,000 thalers were recovered from the Salzburg properties.

Following the Salzburg example, Emperor Charles VI adopted the policy of expelling Protestants from his adjacent Salzkammergut territories from 1734 onwards. As he had no intention to lose any subjects to the Prussian king, he had about 4,000 refugees resettled in the Habsburg crown lands of Transylvania and Hungary. The 1781 Patent of Toleration, issued by Emperor Joseph II, put an end to the Counter-Reformation measures. Nevertheless, still in 1837, the Salzburg archbishop Friedrich Johannes Jacob Celestin von Schwarzenberg urged Emperor Ferdinand I of Austria to expel several hundred Protestants from the Tyrolean Zillertal.

In 1966, Archbishop Andreas Rohracher expressed regret about the expulsions.

== Notable descendants ==
- Agnes Miegel (1879–1964), author
- Franz Schlegelberger (1876–1970), German jurist
- Wernher von Braun (1912–1977), rocket scientist

== See also ==
- Transylvanian Landler
- Zillertal § History
