= Saltzberg =

Saltzberg is a surname. Notable people with the surname include:

- David Saltzberg, American physicist
- Katherine Saltzberg (born 1962), American actress
- Sarah Saltzberg, American actress and singer

== See also ==
- Salzberg (disambiguation)
- Salzburg (disambiguation)
