= Sainsbury =

Sainsbury may refer to:

== People ==
- Sainsbury (surname)
- Sainsbury family, in British business and philanthropy

== Business ==
- Sainsbury's, British business centred on supermarket chain, founded by the Sainsbury family

== See also ==
- Harry Arthur Saintsbury (1869–1939), English actor
- Sansbury, a surname
