= Sainsbury (surname) =

Sainsbury is an English surname. Notable people with the surname include:

- Alfred Sainsbury (1856–1920), Australian police chief
- Amanda Sainsbury-Salis (born 1969), Australian molecular scientist, educator and author
- Amber Sainsbury (born 1978), New Zealand actress
- Ben Sainsbury (born 1972), Canadian-American film director
- Edward Sainsbury (1851–1930), English cricketer
- Lionel Sainsbury (born 1958), English classical composer
- Mark Sainsbury (broadcaster) (born 1956), New Zealand journalist and broadcaster
- Mark Sainsbury (philosopher) (born 1943), British philosopher
- Murray Sainsbury (born 1940), Australian politician
- Peter Sainsbury (1934–2014), English cricketer
- Roger Sainsbury (bishop) (1936–2025), British Anglican bishop
- Roger Sainsbury (engineer) (born 1940), British engineer
- Tony Sainsbury, British chef de mission at multiple Paralympic Games
- Trent Sainsbury (born 1992), Australian footballer
- Sainsbury family, members founded Sainsbury's supermarket chain in the UK
