= Henry Salisbury =

Welsh grammarian and lexicographer

- Born: 1561
- Died: 6 October 1637 (aged 75–76)
- Occupations: Grammarian and lexicographer

Henry Salisbury, or Henry Salesbury, (1561 – 6 October 1637) was a Welsh grammarian and lexicographer.

== Biography ==
Salisbury was born in 1561 at Dolbelidr (now known as Ffynonfair) in the parish of Henllan, Denbighshire. He was probably the youngest son of Foulke, third son of Piers Salesbury of Bachymbyd and Rûg, a branch of the Salesburys of Llewenny, Denbighshire (cf. Williams, Records of Denbigh, p. 182). He matriculated on 15 December 1581 at St. Alban Hall, Oxford, and graduated B.A. on 1 February 1584–5 and (under the name of Robert) M.A. on 28 June 1588 (Foster, Alumni Oxon. s.v.; Clarke, Register, iii. 126). He studied medicine, which he afterwards practised ‘with great success’ at Denbigh; but ‘he was esteemed by the learned not only an eminent physician, but a curious critic, especially as to matters relating to the antiquities and language of his country’ (Wood). Dr. John Davies referred to him as ‘medicus doctis annumerandus.’ In 1593 he published a Welsh grammar in Latin, bearing the title ‘Grammatica Britannica in usum ejus linguæ studiosorum succinctâ methodo et perspicuitate facili conscripta, et nunc primum in lucem edita’ (London, 8vo); the first printed Welsh grammar in Latin, that of Siôn Dafydd Rhys, had appeared in the preceding year. Salesbury dedicated his book to Henry, earl of Pembroke. He also began a Welsh-Latin dictionary, to which he gave the title ‘Geirva Tavod Cymraec: hoc est, Vocabularium Linguæ Gomeritanæ,’ &c., and this he intended to publish with a new edition of his grammar; but, according to Wood, the manuscript was ‘left imperfect,’ and came into the hands of Dr. John Davies, who refers to it as unfinished. Davies is, however, said by Wood to have largely utilised the work in the preparation of his own dictionary; but this must have been with Salesbury's consent, as Davies states in his preface (dated 31 May 1632) that Salesbury was alive at the time of the publication of his work. The manuscript was perused by Edward Lhuyd, who gave in his ‘Archæologia Britannica’ (Oxford, 1707) a list of words included in Salesbury's manuscript, but omitted in Dr. Davies's ‘Dictionary’ (Lhuyd, pp. iv. 213–21). Its present whereabouts is not known.

Some commendatory verses, by Salesbury, in Latin and Welsh, and a metrical version of Psalm xv. are in ‘Egluryn Phraethineb’ (1595), edited by Henry Perry. He seems to have married Margery, daughter of Piers Salesbury of Llanrhaiadr, and to have died in Chester on 6 October 1637, ‘being of great age.’ His second son, Foulke, was an alderman of Chester.
