= Thomas Salusbury =

Thomas Salusbury may refer to:

- Sir Thomas Salisbury (c. 1564–1586), a.k.a. Thomas Salusbury, one of the conspirators executed for his involvement in the Babington Plot
- Sir Thomas Salusbury, 2nd Baronet (1612–1643), a.k.a. Sir Thomas Salisbury, a Welsh poet, politician and Royalist colonel during the Civil War
- Thomas Salusbury (Liverpool MP) (died 1756), British Member of Parliament for Liverpool
- Thomas Salusbury (MP for Flint Boroughs) (by 1518–1561 or later), MP for Flint Boroughs (UK Parliament constituency)
