= Salisbury Township =

Salisbury Township may refer to:

- Salisbury Township, Sangamon County, Illinois
- Salisbury Township, Chariton County, Missouri, in Chariton County, Missouri
- Salisbury Township, Rowan County, North Carolina
- Salisbury Township, Meigs County, Ohio
- Salisbury Township, Lancaster County, Pennsylvania
- Salisbury Township, Lehigh County, Pennsylvania
  - Salisbury Township School District
