= William Salusbury =

William Salusbury or Salesbury may refer to:

- William Salesbury (c. 1520–c. 1584), Welsh scholar
- William Salesbury (of Rhug) (1580–1660), Welsh privateer
- William Salusbury (MP) (1519–1559), MP for Barnstaple
- Sir William Salusbury-Trelawny, 8th Baronet (1781–1856), MP for Cornwall
