= George Salusbury =

16th-century Welsh politician

George Salesbury or Salusbury (fl. 1545) was a Welsh politician.

He was a member (MP) of the parliament of England for Denbigh Boroughs in 1545.
