= John A. Treutlen =

Governor of US province of Georgia, 1777

John Adam Treutlen
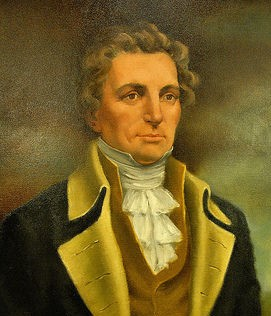

9th Governor of Georgia
- In office May 8, 1777 – January 10, 1778
- Preceded by: Button Gwinnett
- Succeeded by: John Houstoun

Personal details
- Born: Hans Adam Treuettlen; January 16, 1734 Kürnbach, Duchy of Württemberg (now Germany)
- Died: March 1, 1782 (aged 48) Savannah, Georgia, U.S.
- Cause of death: Assassination
- Spouse: Marguerite Dupuis

John Adam Treutlen, born Hans Adam Treuettlen (January 16, 1734 – March 1, 1782) was a German-born politician and businessman who served as the first elected governor of Georgia, (Note: Although neither the first governor of Georgia nor the first governor of the US state of Georgia.) from 1777 to 1778. He was a leader in Georgia during the American Revolution and helped write Georgia's first constitution. He arrived in Colonial America as an indentured servant and rose to become a wealthy merchant and landowner. He became a member of the Georgia House of Representatives, serving in 1782 until his assassination.

== Early life ==
Hans Adam Treuettlen was born to Hans Michel Treuettlen, a cooper, and Magdalena Clara, née Job, in the city of Kürnbach, now in Germany, then a condominium of the Landgraviate of Hesse-Darmstadt and the Duchy of Württemberg. Treutlen's home was located in the part of the city that was ruled by Württemberg. His parents were married in 1731 after their first two children were born. He was the second child born after his parents married. It was Hans Michel's second marriage; his first marriage was to Maria Regina and they had seven children. Maria Regina died in 1727.

The Treutlens were Protestants. In parts of the German-speaking lands, Protestants were persecuted by Catholic authorities, and many left for America seeking religious freedom. Clara, however, was a Catholic. Thus, the Treutlens were also very likely persecuted by the Protestant establishment for Clara's religion and also because the family had two children outside the marriage bond. That situation probably caused the 56-year-old Hans Michel to take, in late April 1744, his wife and four of their children on the arduous and dangerous voyage to seek a new life in America. The four children who went on this voyage were Friedrich, from Hans Michel's first marriage, Hans Philipp, his eldest son by Clara, and his younger two children, John Adam and Jonathan.

The Treutlens traveled first to Gosport on the southern coast of Britain. In November 1745, Clara and three of the children left Gosport for Georgia with a group of Lutheran Salzburgers who had been expelled from their Catholic-dominated homeland (see Salzburg#Religious conflict).

The mother and children embarked on the ill-fated Judith. Hans Michel and one of the children, Hanß Philipp, remained in Britain. During the voyage across the Atlantic, there was an outbreak of typhus fever on the Judith. Thirteen individuals died, including the ship's captain. The first mate also became seriously ill. The Judith was in danger of not making the trip safely for death and illness left no one skilled at navigating a ship on the high seas. However, Rev. Bartholomäus Zuberbühler, who had no prior experience sailing, used his knowledge of geometry to figure out how to navigate the Judith safely to Georgia.

Upon their arrival in Georgia, Clara and the three Treutlen children were indentured to Michael Burckhalter of Vernonburg. Pastor Johann Martin Boltzius of the Salzburgers in Ebenezer took notice of the extraordinary talents of John Treutlen and endeavored to remove him to Ebenezer in order to enroll him at the school there. However, Boltzius found it difficult to arrange for permission for Treutlen's attendance at the school because of Clara's history of abandoned husbands, children born out of wedlock, and Catholicism.

Treutlen's "wicked and worldly parents" were also probably the reason that his true origins remained hidden for so long. For 200 years, it was believed that he was born in Berchtesgaden, Austria. According to that story, the Treutlens, on their way to America, were attacked and the father captured and imprisoned by Spanish pirates. The father was supposed to have died in a Spanish prison in 1744. This story avoids many of the facts of Hans Michel's and Clara's lives together that people of the 18th century may have found disagreeable. The story thus gained credence and then took on a life of its own over the next 200 years. However, marriage, birth, and other documents, which were recently discovered in Europe, have provided a more accurate picture of the Treutlens' European origins and their voyage to America.

== Early career ==
Overcoming the burden of his parents' past, Treutlen was enrolled in the school at Ebenezer. He did extremely well in his studies at Ebenezer and acquired a broad education in a wide variety of subjects in Latin, French, German, and English. He profited from growing up among the Salzburgers. As an adult, he was described as a man who possessed "an enlightened reason, Adam's natural intelligence and ability to give a name to every animal, knowledge of the laws of the land, and some discernment of practical religion."

In 1756, Treutlen married Marguerite Dupuis, an orphan who was also educated at Ebenezer. He soon began acquiring land and established for himself a large plantation and a successful merchant business. In 1768, he was appointed Justice of the Peace. He served as Commissioner and Surveyor of Roads, and several terms in the 1770s as Ebenezer's representative in the Georgia Commons House of Assembly.

Treutlen assumed an active role in the religious life at Ebenezer. He was a teacher at the school there. He was a leader of the Rabenhorst faction in the sometimes-violent conflicts between the Ebenezer pastors, the Reverend Christoph Triebner and the Reverend Christian Rabenhorst. His association with Rev. Rabenhorst indicated Treutlen's religious sympathies. Ministers such as Rev. Rabenhorst and Rev. John Joachim Zubly of Savannah, found comfort in the writings of such German theologians as Rev. Johann Joachim Spalding. Those ministers accepted the many differences among the people in the colonies as a result of the different countries and cultures of those people. In their practical day-to-day activities of ministering to the diverse population, those ministers found it most effective to employ various strategies in the gracious work of conversion.

Treutlen's religious views, formed by his association with Rev. Rabenhorst, undoubtedly helped him to develop his support for the democratic political institutions that seemed so agreeable with this diversity.

In July 1775, Treutlen represented Ebenezer at the Provincial Congress. He took an active role in the revolution. He quickly became a leader, along with Button Gwinnett and George Wells, of the radical faction. In February 1777, Treutlen, Gwinnett, and Wells were on the committee that drafted Georgia's first constitution. As a result, the constitution included such democratic provisions as virtually-universal suffrage and annual elections of office holders. On May 8, 1777, the immensely-popular Treutlen was elected by a wide margin as Georgia's first governor under this new constitution. With the selection of Treutlen, Georgia chose a man who "possesses native intelligence" and could, under pressure, reply "coolly and laconically" to his political opponents and was thus well suited for the difficult task of leading the new state.

== Governorship ==
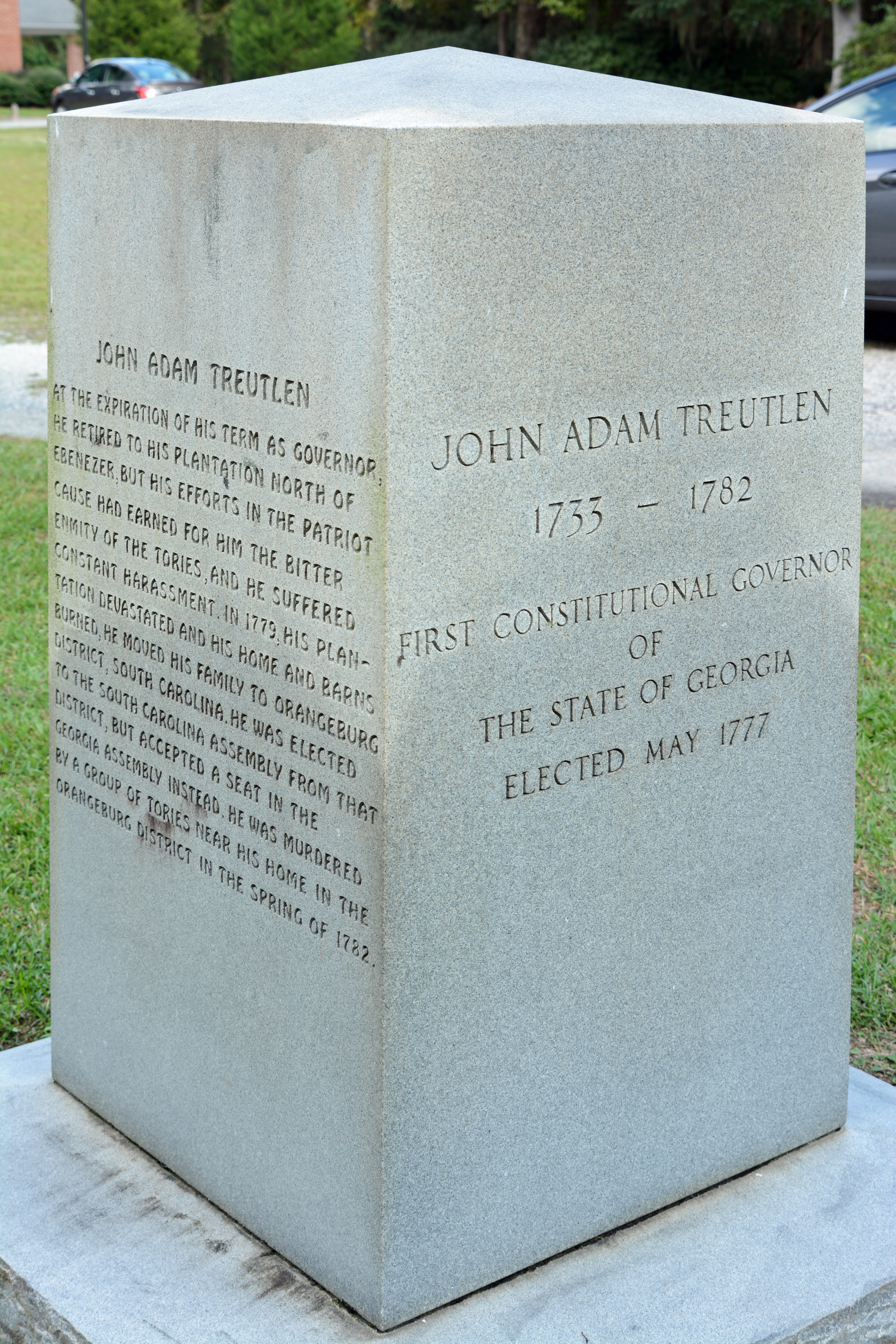
Treutlen monument in Ebenezer, Georgia.

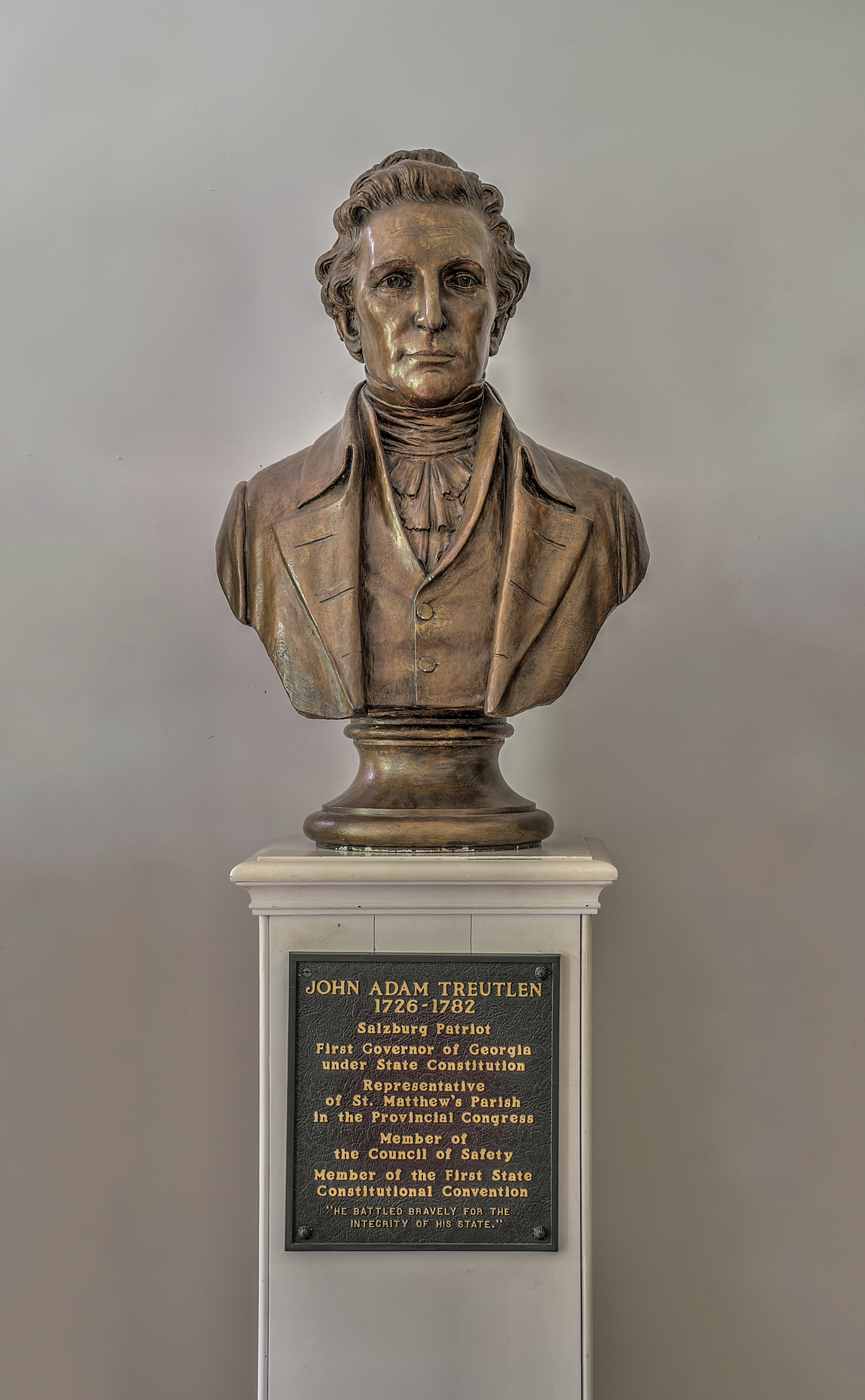
Bust of Treutlen at the Washington-Wilkes Historical Museum

Treutlen's term as governor was marked by political conflicts between the radical and the conservative factions of the patriots. The conservatives opposed the democratic provisions of the new constitution that allowed many of those from the lower classes, with backgrounds like the former indentured servant Treutlen, to be elected to positions of power in the government. The radicals referred to the conservatives as Tories and, in some cases, treated them accordingly. The radicals and the conservatives clashed over the issues of civil control of the military, the conduct of the war and the conservatives' initiative to merge Georgia with South Carolina. The radicals were defeated in their attempts to remove the conservative General Lachlan McIntosh from his position of leadership in the continental army in Georgia when national leaders, such as George Washington, sided with McIntosh.

Throughout the war, those political conflicts erupted into violent and tragic confrontations. In February 1777, the conservative Joseph Habersham killed the radical Lieutenant Nathaniel Hughes in a dispute at the opening of the convention that was called to write Georgia's first constitution. On May 16, 1777, the conservative General McIntosh mortally wounded the radical Gwinnett. On February 16, 1780, the conservative James Jackson killed the radical Wells. Treutlen and the radicals lost many of their battles with the conservatives.

The Revolutionary War was particularly hard on the Salzburgers at Ebenezer. During the war, "when the English left, the Americans came, when the Americans went, the English came back," but one thing remained the same: no matter who was there, the Salzburgers were plundered. Some were plundered as many as ten times during the years of war.

== Fall ==
On December 30, 1776, Rev. Rabenhorst died, leaving Ebenezer with no spiritual guidance. Thus, when John Houstoun was elected governor in January 1778, Treutlen dropped out of statewide politics and returned to Ebenezer to see what he could do to help the community and people that had provided him with so much during his three decades in America. At Savannah, he became a Freemason by joining the first Masonic Lodge established in Georgia, named Solomon's Lodge, No. 1., constituted in 1735 by the Grand Lodge of England, was founded in the Georgia Colony by the English Freemason James Oglethorpe on February 21, 1734. Treutlen's name is listed on the Lodge's Masonic membership roles in 1779 along with Archibald Bulloch, George Walton, General Samuel Elbert and many other Georgia leaders of the Revolution.

Late in 1781, Treutlen re-entered statewide politics as Ebenezer's elected representative to the Georgia Assembly. He served in the January 1782 session. In 1782, the conservatives, whom Treutlen had opposed five years earlier, controlled the government of Georgia. Treutlen was one of the few radical democrats in the government that year. The imbalance in power between the radicals and the conservatives helped to create an atmosphere where the conservatives felt free to seek revenge for old scores and wounds.

== Assassination ==
On a night in March 1782, by some accounts, five men rode up to the Treutlen home. They demanded for Treutlen to come outside, but he refused. The men then set fire to the home, forcing Treutlen, his wife and children to come outside. The men seized Treutlen and killed him in full view of his family. Other accounts of Treutlen's death are considerably different as to the details of the attack. Some versions even place his death in South Carolina, not Georgia, and give a later date (late 1782 or early 1783), but there is no dispute that he died by some kind of mob violence.

Historians continue to speculate about what person or group was behind the killing and what was the motive. Some contemporary accounts claimed Treutlen was killed by Tories angry about the American victory in the Revolutionary War. Others blamed the killing on South Carolinians who resented his opposition to merging Georgia into South Carolina during the war. There was also speculation at the time that the motive was a purely personal grudge. The multiplicity of accounts and theories of his death indicates that there was never a consensus about the cause of the event.

== Legacy ==
Treutlen County, Georgia is named after him.

== See also ==
- List of United States governors born outside the United States

Political offices
Preceded by Button Gwinnett	Governor of Georgia; 1777–1778	Succeeded by John Houstoun
