= Salzburger emigrants =

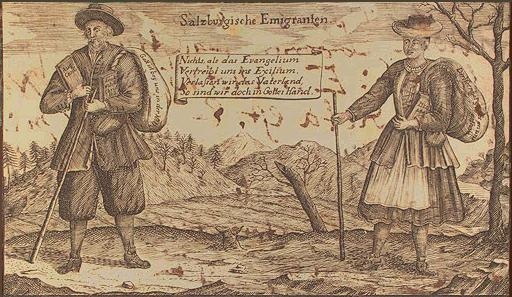
The exiled Protestants from Salzburg, circa 1732

The Salzburger Emigrants were a group of German-speaking Protestant refugees from the Catholic Archbishopric of Salzburg (now in present-day Austria) that immigrated to the Georgia Colony in 1734 to escape religious persecution. This group was expelled from their homeland by Count Leopold Anton von Firmian (1679–1744), Prince-Archbishop of Salzburg. On October 31, 1731, he issued an Edict of Expulsion demanding from the Salzburg Protestants to recant their faith. Pastor Samuel Urlsperger, the leader of the Society for Promotion of Christian Knowledge, called upon King George II of Great Britain for help. The King offered them refuge in his Georgia colony, which later became the town of Ebenezer.

== History ==
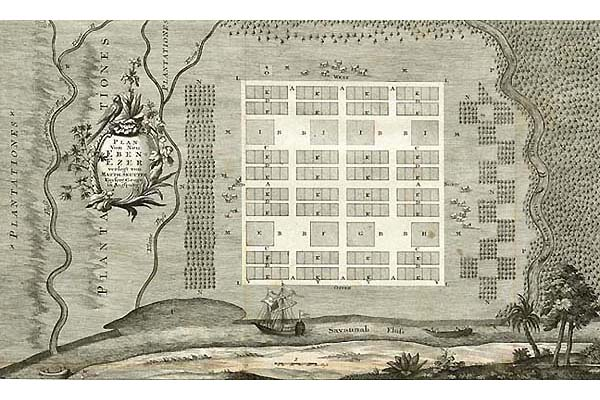
The settlement of New Ebenezer in the English colony of Georgia, founded 1736

In 1734, Johann Martin Boltzius and Israel Gronau led the group of 300 Salzburgers who sailed from England to Georgia. They arrived in Charleston, South Carolina on March 7, and proceeded to Savannah on March 12. James Oglethorpe, the founder of the Georgia colony, met them upon arrival and assigned them the piece of land that would become Ebenezer.

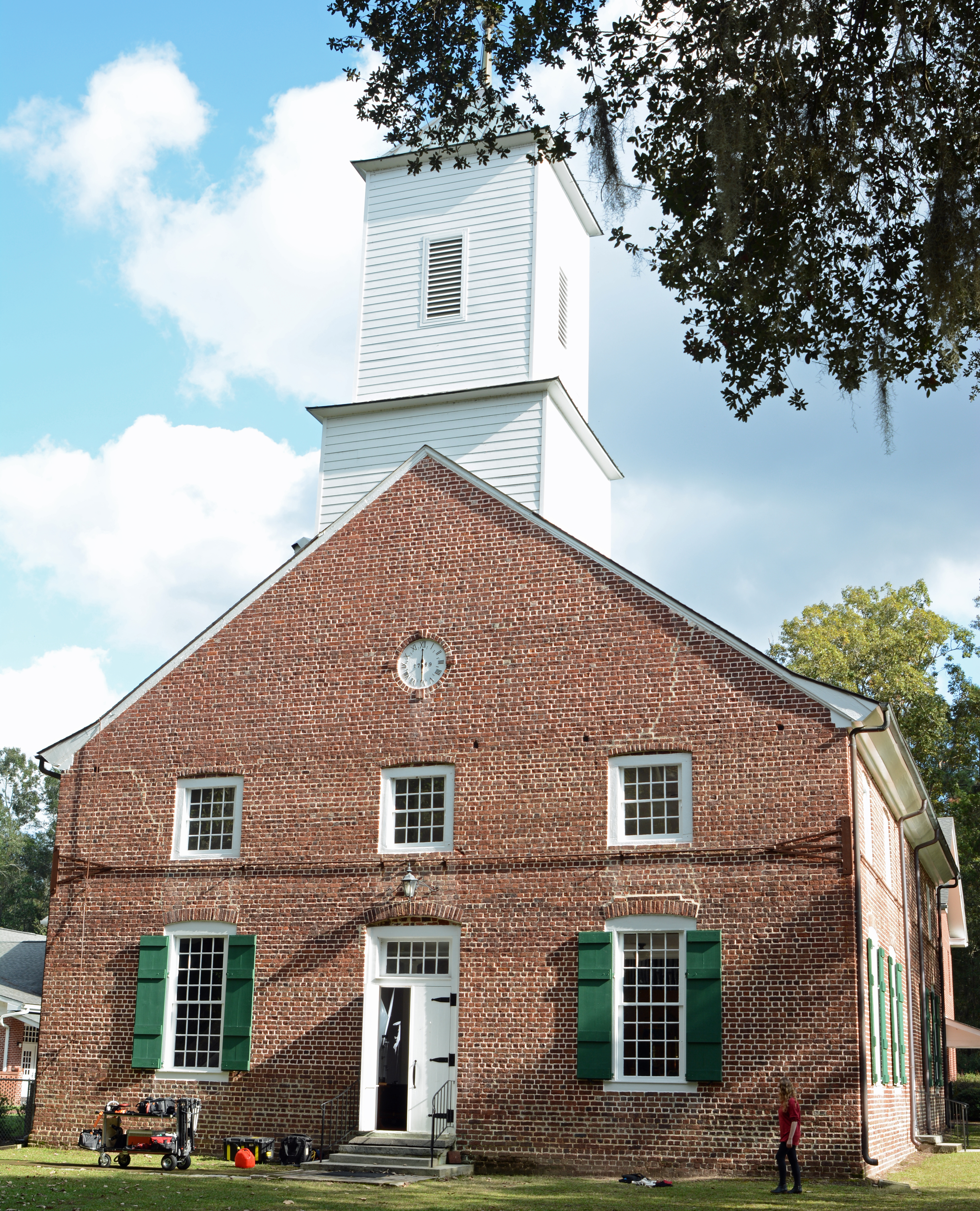
Jerusalem Lutheran Church, Ebenezer, GA

The Salzburgers experienced several obstacles during this first attempt at fully establishing their community. Over 30 of the settlers died due to complications from dysentery and many newborn children died within the first month. The settlement was too far inland with little access to the waterways, rendering the land infertile. Until they could relocate, their alliance with the Trustees would result in enough financial support to sustain them. Boltzius knew that the Salzburgers would fail completely if they did not resettle the community.

In 1736, General Oglethorpe settled a group of German Lutherans (Salzburgers) in St. Simons Island, Georgia, establishing their settlement as "German Village" where they planted, fished, and sold their products. German Village is located in the area of Village Drive, off Lawrence Rd, on the northern part of the island. The Salzburgers also helped build nearby Fort Frederica.(German Village)

Also in 1736, their leader Boltzius was able to secure a new settlement after much negotiation with Oglethorpe. The Salzburgers resettled above the Savannah River and this community was referred to as New Ebenezer. By the end of 1737, the Salzburgers were able to establish legitimate farmsteads. In the next few years, they would create a water-driven grist mill in Georgia. Much of their success was still due in large part to support from the Trustees. Despite high death rates, the Salzburgers began to prosper by gradually transitioning their income methods from subsistence farming to silk and timber production, both of which were labor-intensive. In order for the Salzburgers to continue expanding, Boltzius and the Salzburger leaders introduced slaves. This action had been rigorously opposed by the Salzburgers since their arrival. The Salzburgers succeeded at farming, specifically cattle breeding. The Salzburgers also established grist and saw mills, which helped them establish new sources of income through production and trade.

By the mid-eighteenth century, the community expanded and new settlements began to form. The community grew to over 1,200 people. After the death of Boltzius in 1765, the Salzburger identity and traditions began to fade. The Jerusalem Church is one of the only remaining remnants of the Salzburgers today. The church was completed in 1769 and is the oldest church building in the state that is still in use.

In 1966, Salzburg Archbishop Andreas Rohracher expressed regret about the expulsions.

== See also ==
- Ebenezer, Georgia
- Johann Martin Boltzius
- John A. Treutlen
- Georgia Salzburger Society
- Salzburg Protestants
