= Ebenezer, Georgia =

- Ebenezer Townsite and Jerusalem Lutheran Church
- U.S. National Register of Historic Places
- U.S. Historic district
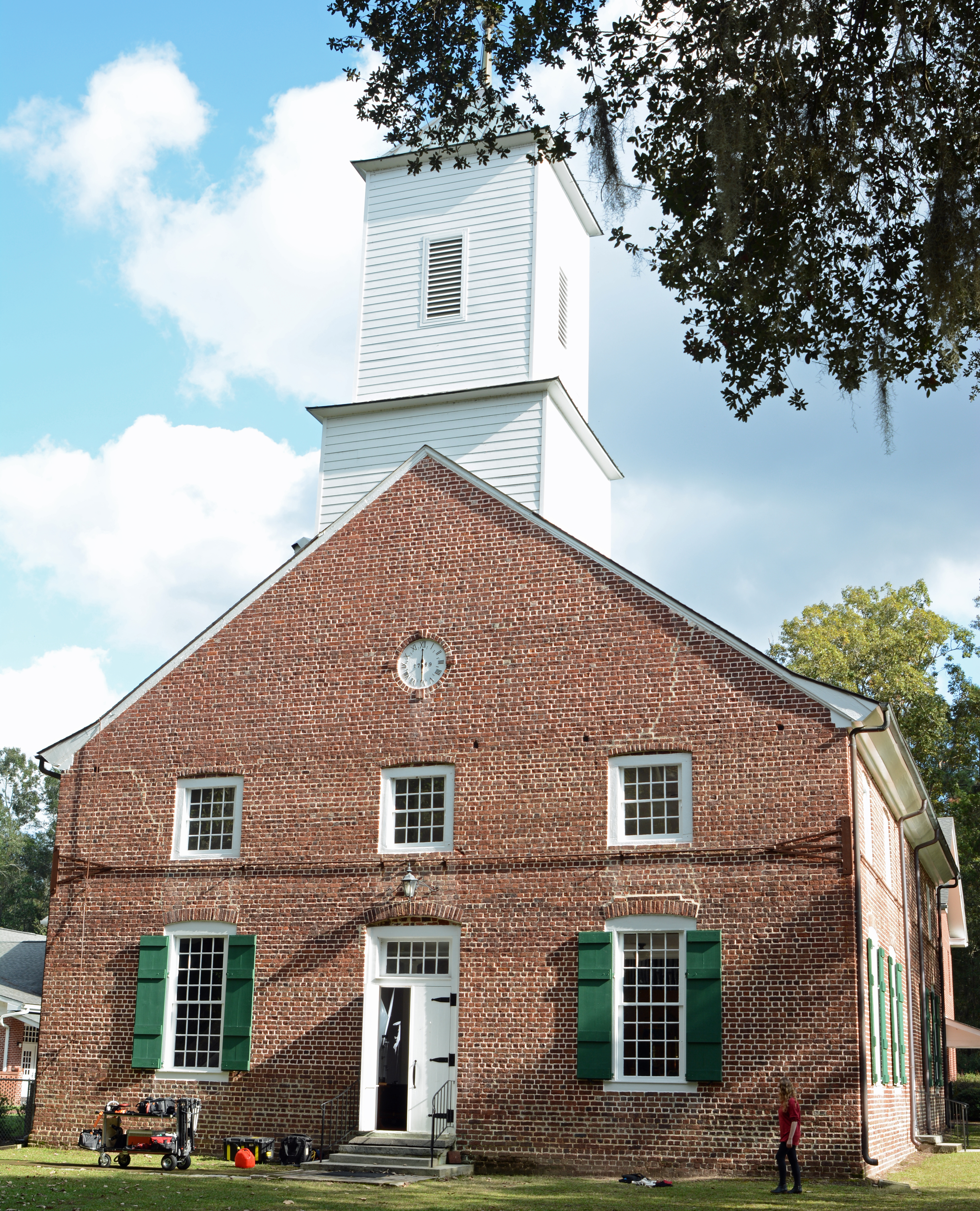
- Jerusalem Lutheran Church

- Location within Georgia Location within the United States
- Location: Effingham County, Georgia
- Nearest city: Rincon, Georgia / Springfield, Georgia
- Coordinates: 32.376667°N 81.180833°W
- Built: 1767
- NRHP reference No.: 74000674
- Added to NRHP: December 4, 1974

Ebenezer, also known as New Ebenezer, is a ghost town in Effingham County, Georgia, United States, near Ebenezer Creek, on the banks of the Savannah River. It was listed on the U.S. National Register of Historic Places as Ebenezer Townsite and Jerusalem Lutheran Church in 1974.

== History ==
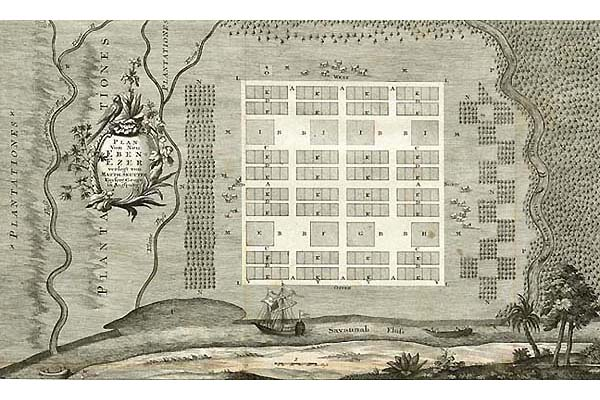
Map of New Ebenezer, founded 1736

The town was established in 1734 by about 150 Salzburger emigrants, Protestant refugees who had been expelled from the Catholic Archbishopric of Salzburg (in present-day Austria) by a 1731 edict of Prince-archbishop Count Leopold Anton von Firmian. With the consent of governor James Oglethorpe, New Ebenezer was moved closer to the Savannah River in 1736, and at its new location many silk mills were opened. The Salzburger's pastor, the Reverend Johann Martin Boltzius, sought to build "a religious utopia on the Georgia frontier."

That idea was very successful for a time, and the economy thrived. Jerusalem Lutheran Church was completed in 1769. It is the oldest church building in Georgia, the fourth-oldest building in Georgia, and the oldest continuously operational Lutheran congregation in the U.S.

But, after the British invasion of 1778 during the American Revolutionary War, the town was severely damaged. It never fully recovered, although it briefly served as the capital of Georgia in 1782. It was made the county seat of Effingham County in 1797, but two years later the seat was transferred to Springfield, taking much county business with it. By the time Ebenezer was abandoned in 1855, the town covered only 1/4 square mile. The Jerusalem Evangelical Lutheran Church is one of the few buildings that has survived in Ebenezer, and is believed to have the oldest continuing congregation in the state.

Union General Jefferson C. Davis, also known as "General Reb", betrayed hundreds of former enslaved people during Sherman's March to the Sea, leaving them to drown in Ebenezer Creek.

The Ebenezer Townsite and Jerusalem Lutheran Church were listed on the National Register of Historic Places on December 4, 1974. The New Ebenezer Camp, established 1977, is located in former Ebenezer. In 1987, the LAMAR Institute began an archaeological study of Ebenezer. Several reports from its researchers are available online at the institute's website.

One of the more notable people from Ebenezer was John A. Treutlen, the first state governor of Georgia.

== See also ==
- New Ebenezer Retreat & Conference Center
- Treutlen House at New Ebenezer
- Johann Martin Boltzius
- John A. Treutlen
- Georgia Salzburger Society
- John Skey Eustace
- Salzburger emigrants
- List of the oldest churches in the United States
- List of the oldest buildings in Georgia
