= Johann Ernst von Thun und Hohenstein =

Czech archbishop (1643–1709)

His Grace Johann Ernst von Thun und Hohenstein
- Prince-Archbishop of Salzburg
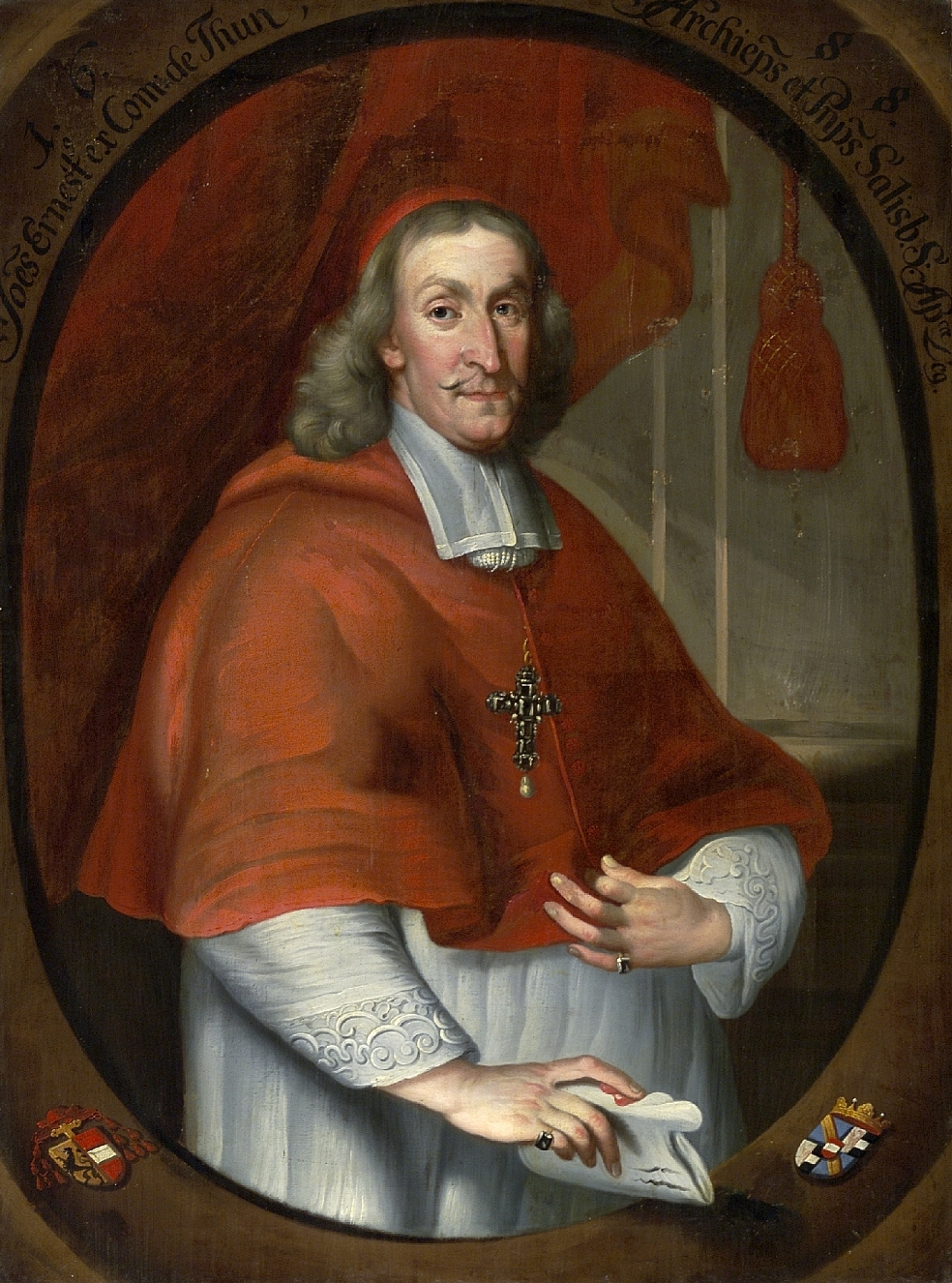
- Portrait as Archbishop, 1688
- Church: Roman Catholic Church
- Archdiocese: Salzburg
- See: Cathedral of Saints Rupert and Vergilius
- Installed: 24 November 1687
- Term ended: 20 April 1709
- Predecessor: Max Gandolph von Kuenburg
- Successor: Franz Anton von Harrach
- Other post: Bishop of Seckau

Personal details
- Born: 3 July 1643 Prague, Bohemia, Holy Roman Empire
- Died: 20 April 1709 (aged 65) Salzburg, Archbishopric of Salzburg, Holy Roman Empire

Johann Ernst Graf von Thun und Hohenstein (3 July 1643 – 20 April 1709) was Bishop of Seckau from 1679 to 1687 and Prince-archbishop of Salzburg from 1687 until his death.

== Life and career ==
Born in Prague, Bohemia, he was a member of the Tyrolean Thun und Hohenstein noble family, elevated to the rank of Imperial Counts (Reichsgrafen) in 1629. His elder half-brother Guidobald was Archbishop of Salzburg from 1654 to 1668. Johann Ernst von Thun was ordained a priest in 1677. He was elected Bishop of Seckau in Styria on 29 December 1679 and consecrated by the Salzburg archbishop Max Gandolf von Kuenburg the next year. Thun succeeded Kuenburg by election on 30 June 1687, obtaining the prince-archiepiscopal dignities.

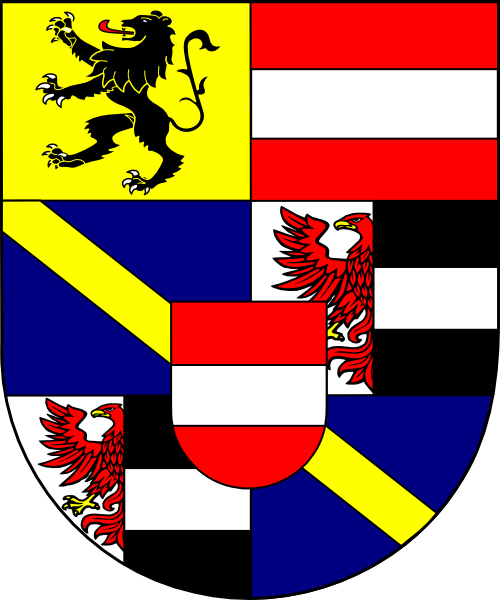
Coat of arms

The archbishop is best remembered as patron of the architect Johann Bernhard Fischer von Erlach, a leading proponent of Austrian Baroque church architecture. Thun had his Salzburg residence lavishly rebuilt, including the Collegiate Church, the Holy Trinity Church, and Schloss Klessheim. Throughout his reign, however, he displayed a marked antipathy to the Italian designers and tastemakers that were emulated by many German monarchs at the time. Upon his accession, he halted work on a church being built for the Italian Theatine order and denied payment to Italian craftsmen, resulting in longstanding court proceedings.

Thun, backed by Pope Innocent XII, prevailed in lengthy quarrels with the Salzburg cathedral chapter as well as with the neighbouring Bishops of Chiemsee and Passau. In 1697, he obliged all graduates of Salzburg's university to swear belief in the Immaculate Conception. He remained a harsh persecutor of Crypto-protestantism in his Salzburg lands; these measures were later once again intensified under his successor Leopold Anton von Firmian. On the other hand, Thun supported the leading members of the Braunau Parliament during the Bavarian uprising of 1705–06 against the occupying forces of the Habsburg emperor Joseph I.

Archbishop von Thun was buried in Salzburg Cathedral. By his will, he had his brain deposited in the university chapel, his entrails (symbolizing compassion) deposited in his hospital church, and his heart interred at his favorite Holy Trinity Church.

Religious titles
| Preceded by Max Gandolph von Kuenburg | Archbishop of Salzburg; 1687-1709 | Succeeded by Franz Anton von Harrach |
