= Kollegienkirche, Salzburg =

Kollegienkirche Collegiate Church
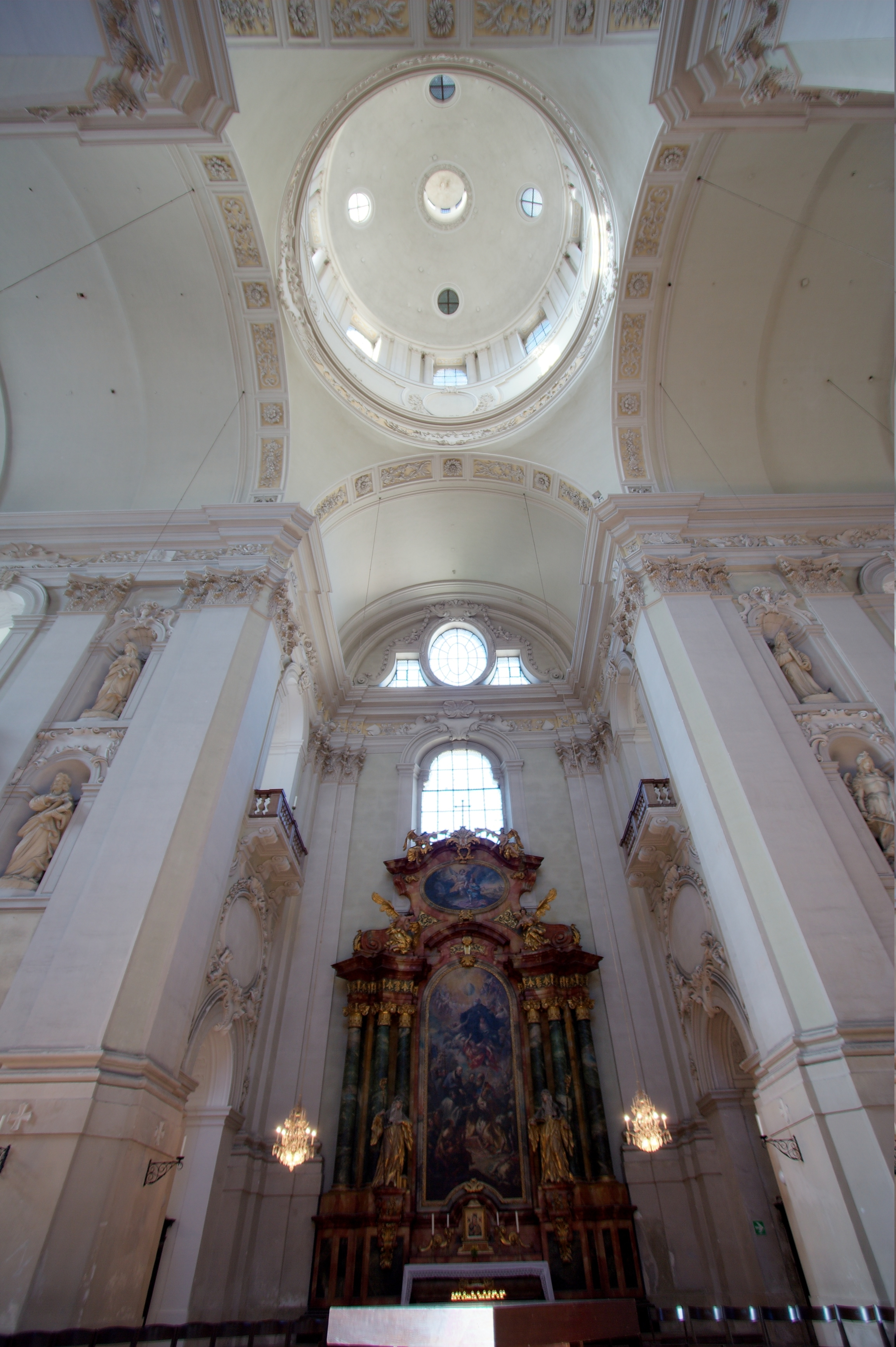
- Main vault and a side altar
- Kollegienkirche; Collegiate Church
- 47.7991°N 13.0431°E
- Location: Salzburg
- Country: Austria
- Denomination: Roman Catholic
- Website: www.kollegienkirche.at

History
- Dedication: Immaculate Conception

Architecture
- Functional status: University church; Salzburg Festival venue
- Style: Baroque
- Completed: 1707

Administration
- Diocese: Salzburg
- Parish: Universitätspfarrsprengel

UNESCO World Heritage Site
- Official name: Historic Centre of Salzburg
- Type: Cultural
- Region: Europe and North America

The Kollegienkirche (Collegiate Church) in Salzburg, Austria, is the church of the University of Salzburg. It was built in Baroque style by Johann Bernhard Fischer von Erlach. Dedicated to the Immaculate Conception, it is part of the UNESCO World Heritage Site Historic Centre of Salzburg. It is now both the parish church of people connected to the university and a venue of the Salzburg Festival.

== History ==
The building is the church of the University of Salzburg, located at the Universitätsplatz (University square). Bishop Paris von Lodron planned a university church on the location of the former Frauengarten, instead of using the Aula (main auditorium) for church services of the university. While two successors were not able to realise the plan, Johann Ernst von Thun succeeded as part of his plan to develop Salzburg in Baroque style. The building by Johann Bernhard Fischer von Erlach was begun in 1694. In 1707, it was dedicated to the Immaculate Conception, which is celebrated on 8 December, a national holiday in Austria. It is believed that Mozart's Missa brevis in D Minor, K. 65, was commissioned by the church and premiered on 4 February 1769.

During the occupation by Napoleon, the church was used as storage. After the university was dissolved, it served as a garrison church. In 1922, the Salzburg Festival performed there the premiere of Hugo von Hofmannsthal's Das Salzburger große Welttheater, directed by Max Reinhardt. In 1969, Emilio de' Cavalieri's Rappresentatione di Anima, et di Corpo was presented in an arrangement by Bernhard Paumgartner. The church has been a regular venue of the festival since the 1970s. In 2008, Salvatore Sciarrino's opera Luci mie traditrici was staged by Rebecca Horn.

The church was returned to its original status as a university church in 1964. On 18 May 2008, it was designated the parish church for a parish named Universitätspfarrsprengel, serving people connected to the university. The building has been restored in the 21st century, beginning with the apse, which was completed in 2010. Most of the other restoration was completed in 2013.

The church is a listed monument and part of the UNESCO World Heritage Site Historic Centre of Salzburg.

== Architecture ==
The church is a main work of Fischer von Erlach. He designed a hall with white walls without paintings which became a model for late-baroque churches in southern Germany.

The organ was built in 1866 to 1868 by Matthäus Mauracher, an instrument of 34 stops on three manuals and pedal. Anton Bruckner played the organ several times. The organ was restored in 1982 by Orgelbau Pirchner.

== Literature ==
- Alice Schulte: Die Kollegienkirche in Salzburg. Eine impressionistische Studie. In: Mitteilungen der Gesellschaft für Salzburger Landeskunde 57, Salzburg 1917, p. 1–12.
- Felicitas Hagen-Dempf: Die Kollegienkirche in Salzburg. Wien 1949.

== Gallery ==
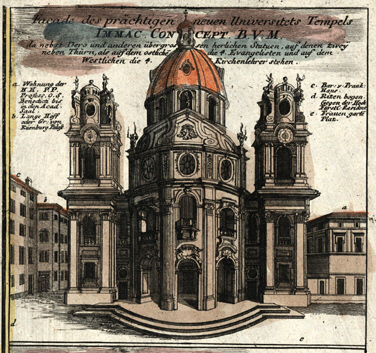
The facade, circa 1712

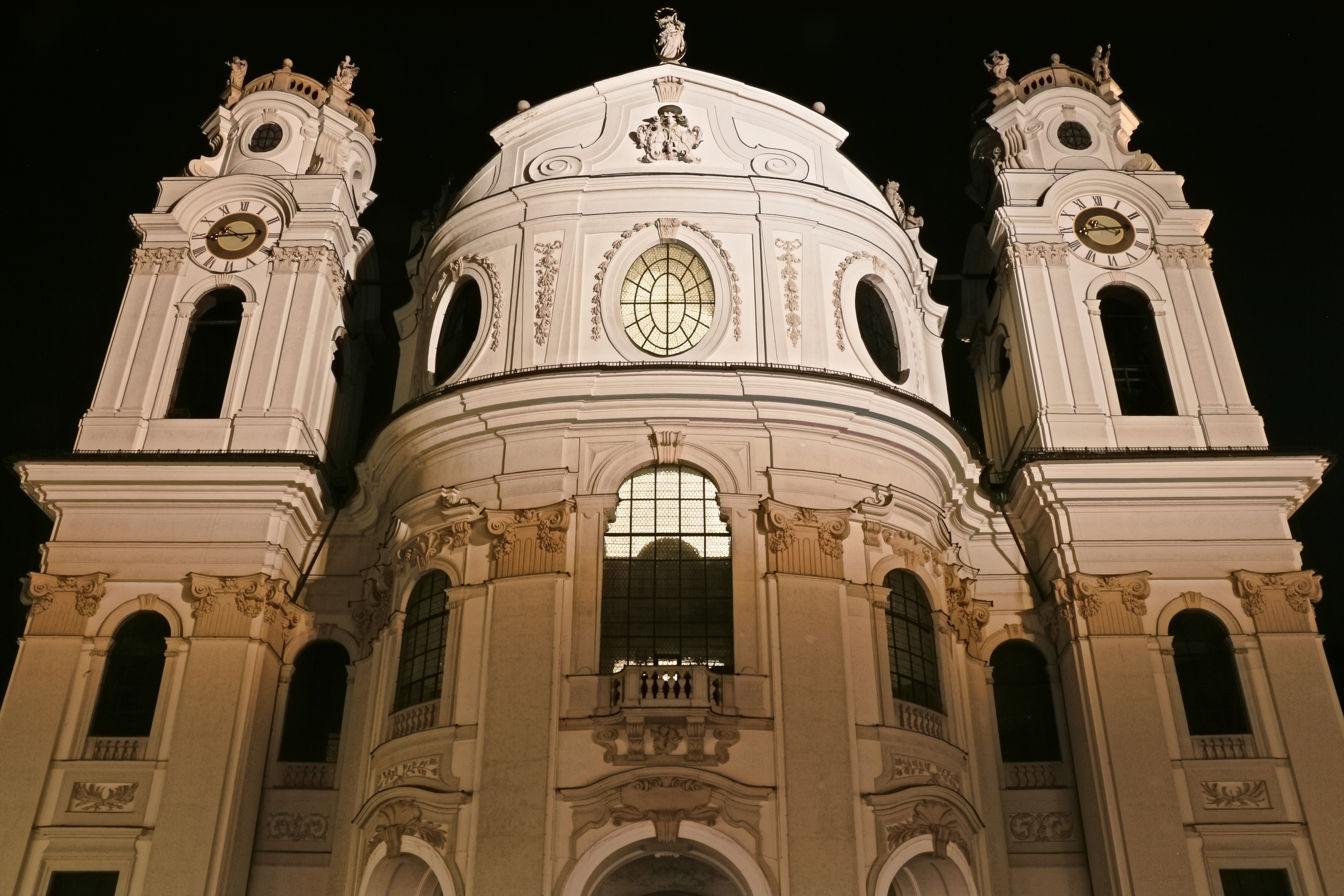
The facade of the church at night

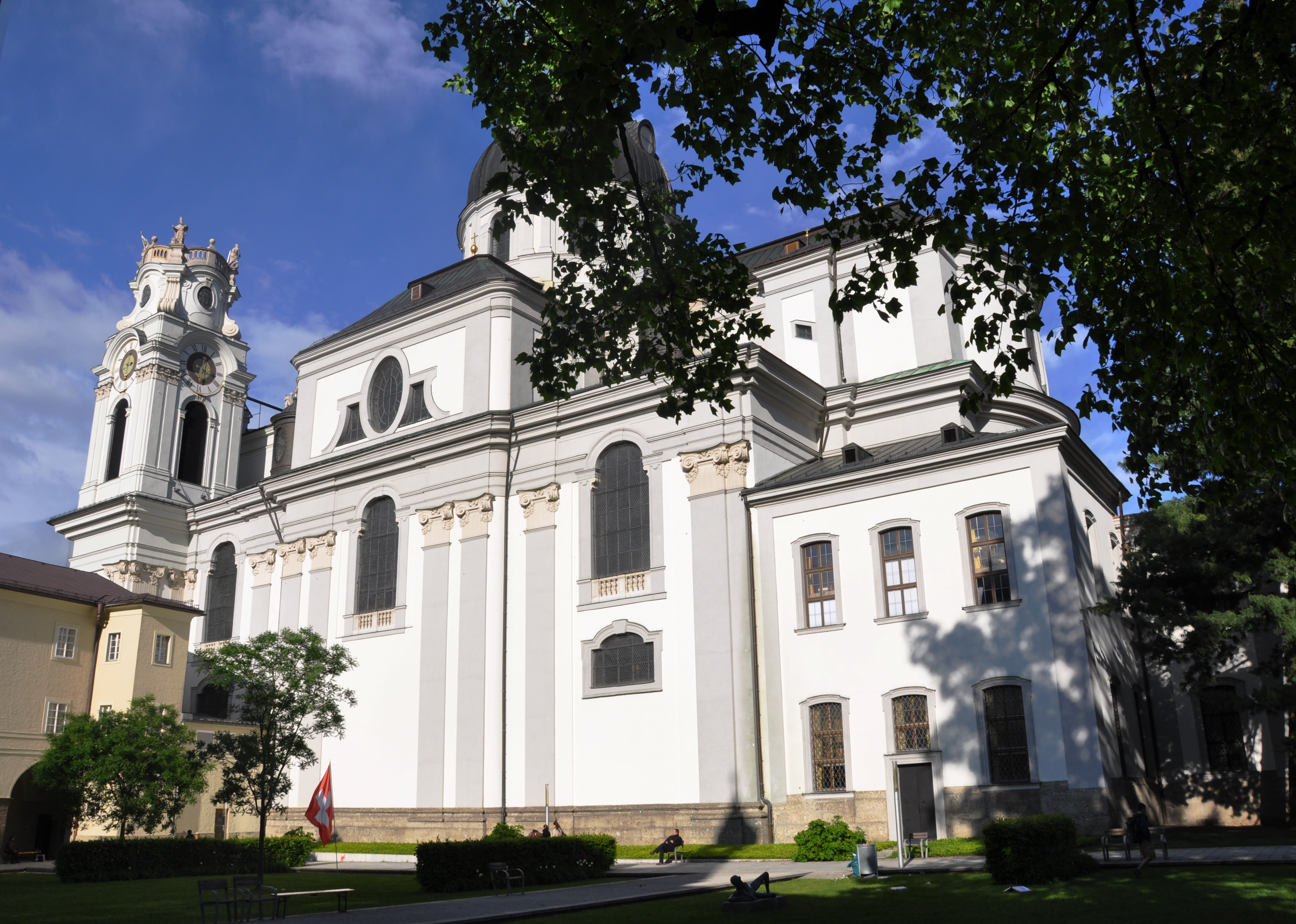
A side of the church

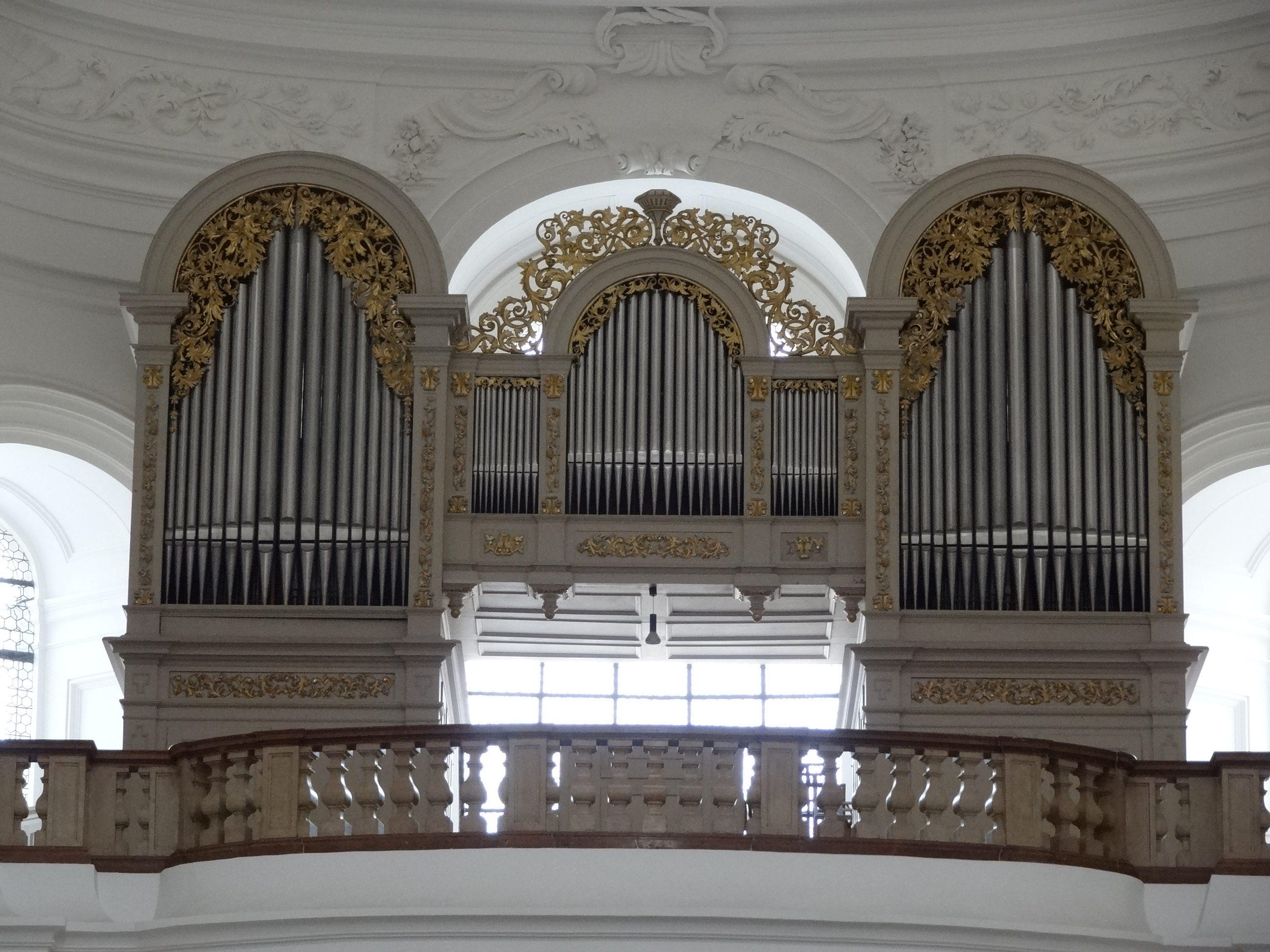
The Matthäus Mauracher organ
