= Schloss Klessheim =

Palace in Wals-Siezenheim, Austria

Coordinates: 47°49′06″N 12°59′45″E

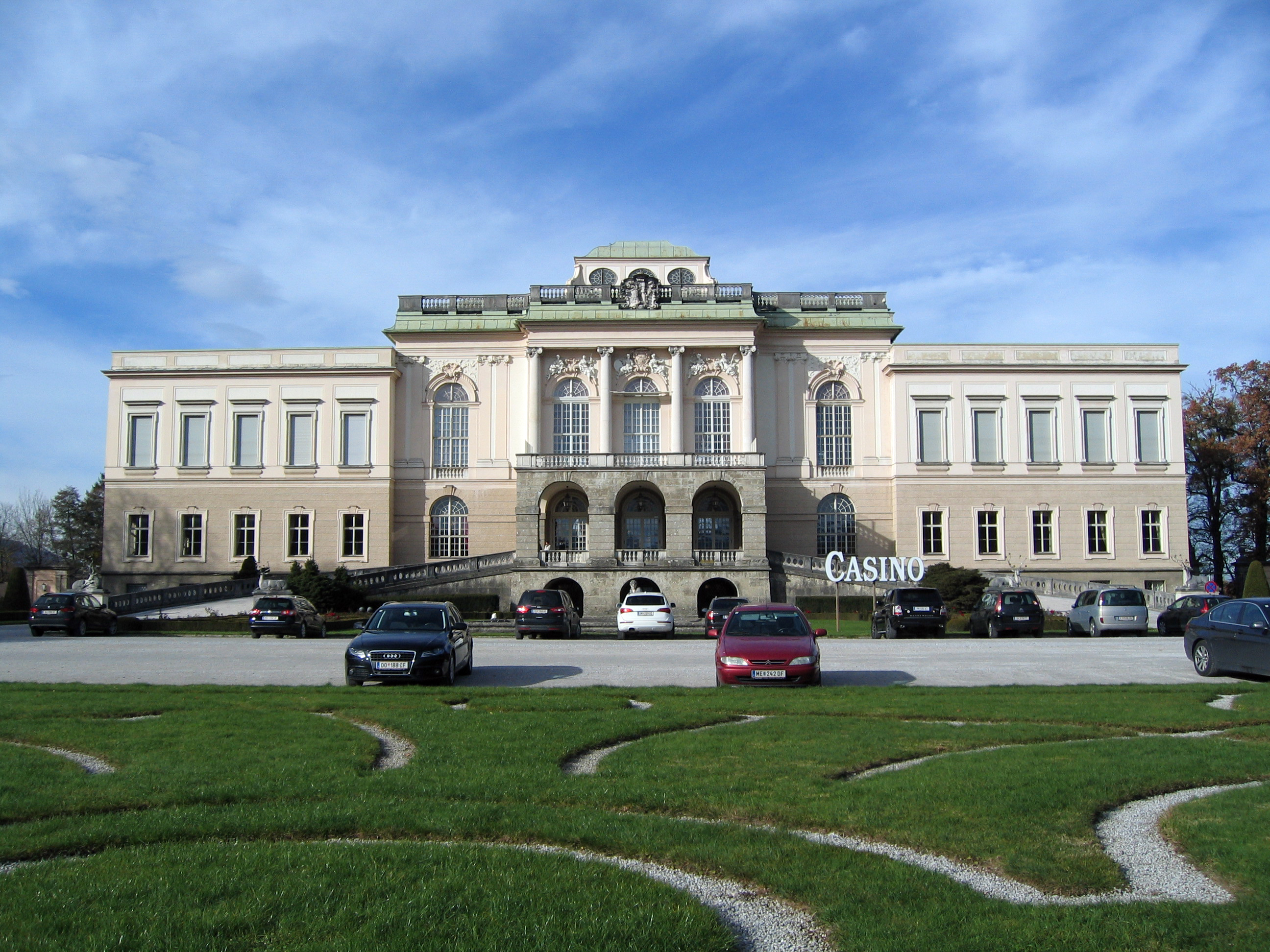
Schloss Klessheim in Salzburg

Schloss Klessheim is a Baroque palace located in Wals-Siezenheim, 4 km (2.5 mi) west of Salzburg, Austria. The palace was designed and constructed by Austrian architect Johann Bernhard Fischer von Erlach for Prince-Archbishop Johann Ernst von Thun in 1700. It became the summer residence of the Archbishops of Salzburg. Since 1993, the palace has been used by Salzburg Casino.

== History ==
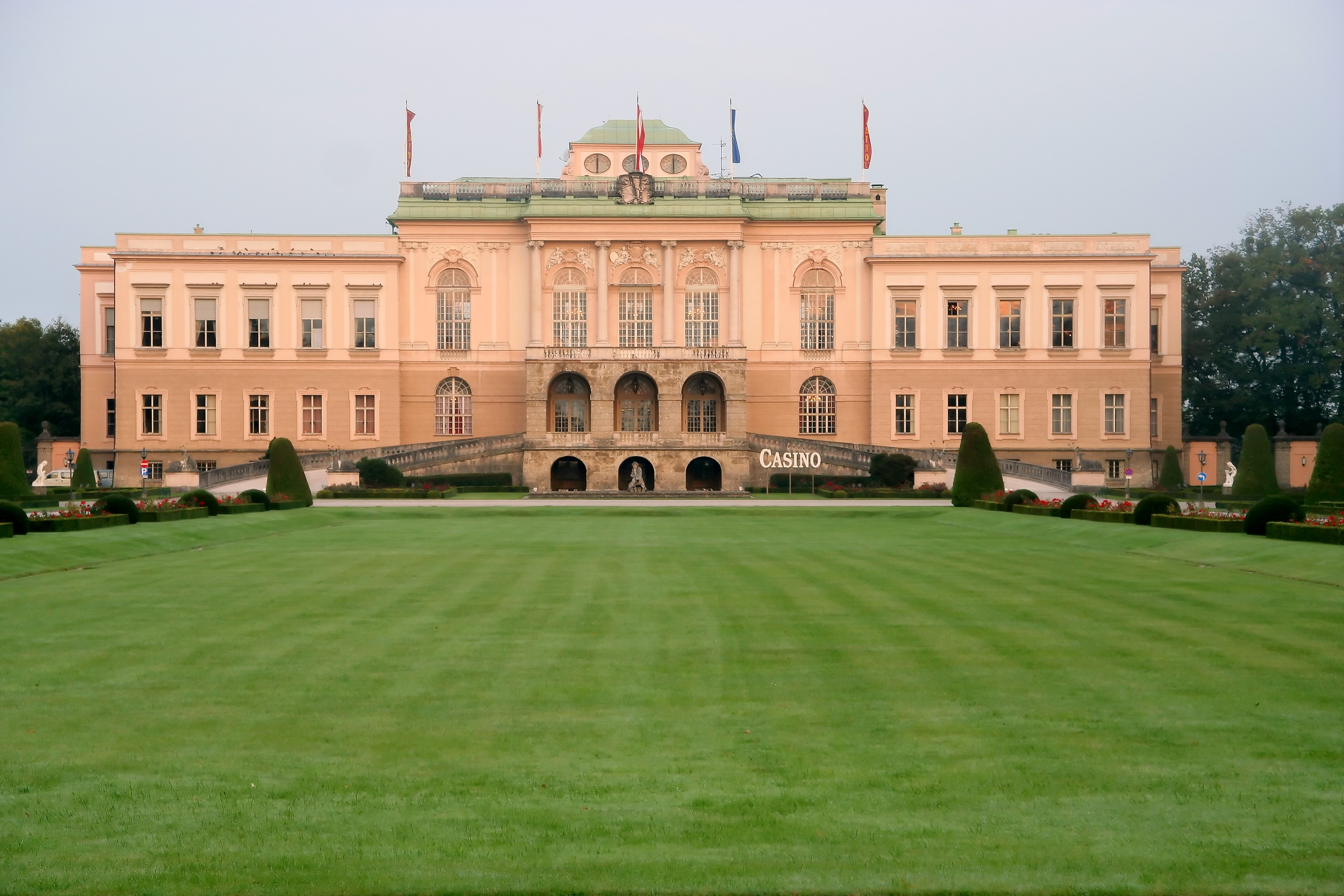
Schloss Klessheim

In the late 17th century, Prince-Archbishop Johann Ernst von Thun purchased the small aristocratic estate and Kleshof manor house at this site. In 1700, he commissioned Austrian architect Johann Bernhard Fischer von Erlach to expand the manor house and construct an elegant palace. Influenced by the north Italian Mannerist style, Fischer von Erlach worked on the palace, which was called Lustschloss Favorita, between 1700 and 1709. Construction was interrupted following the archbishop's death in 1709. His successor, Archbishop Franz Anton von Harrach cancelled work in favor of Schloss Mirabell. Schloss Klessheim was completed in 1732 under Archbishop Count Leopold Anton von Firmian, who curtailed the original plans significantly.

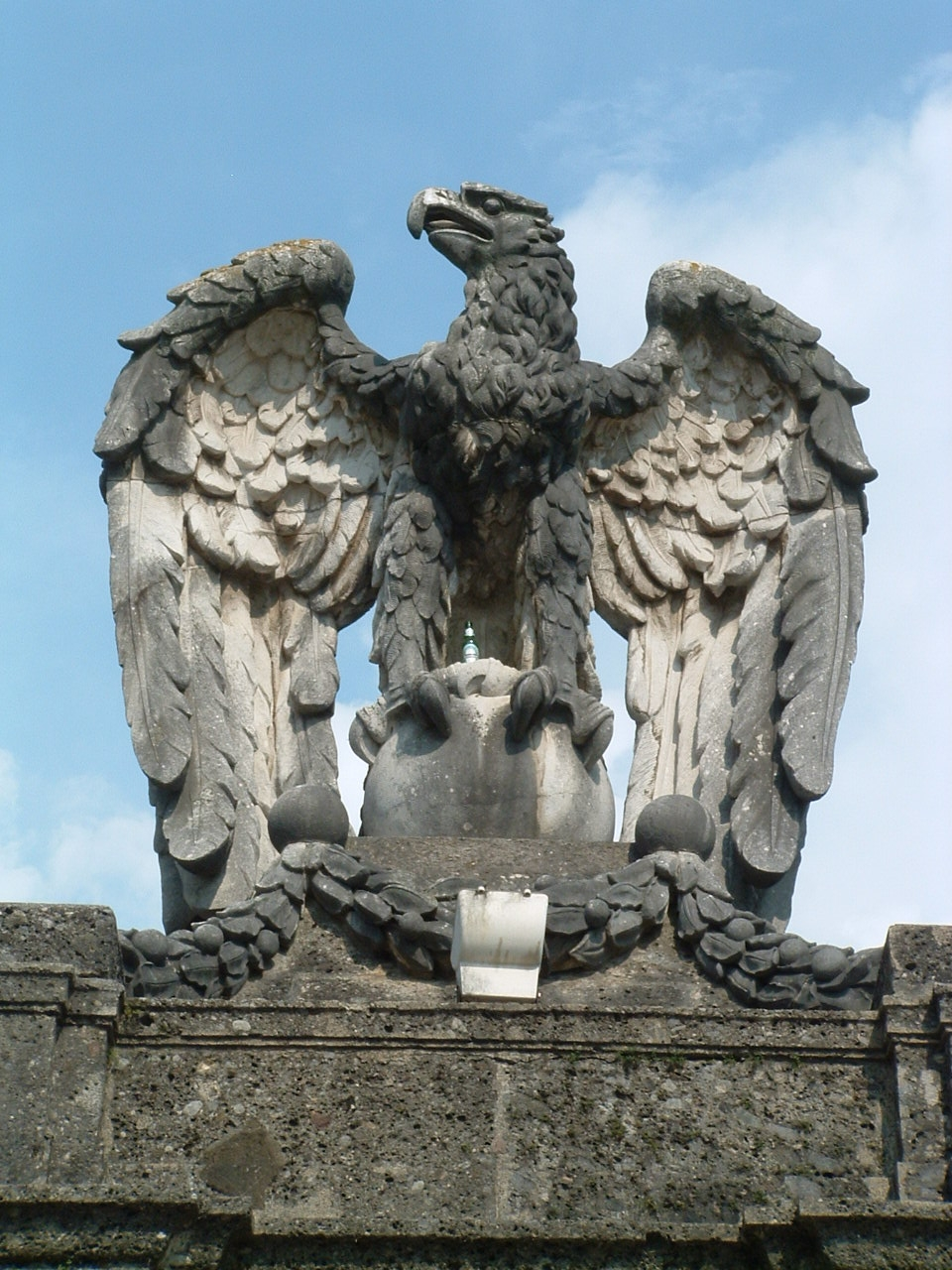
Eagle added after 1938

The completed palace contained a ceremonial hall with an extended terrace and ramp leading to the gardens, an entrance with an impressive Triton Fountain, a loggia and an entrance hall and staircase. The interior stucco work was done by Paolo d'Allio and Diego Francesco Carlone, according to plans by Fischer von Erlach.

In the late 18th century, an English landscape garden was added under the rule of Archbishop Count Hieronymus von Colloredo. After Salzburg's secularisation in 1803, Klessheim Palace fell to the Austrian House of Habsburg-Lorraine. In 1866 it became the permanent residence of Archduke Ludwig Viktor of Austria (1842–1919), a younger brother of Emperor Franz Joseph I. The archduke had the palace extended according to plans designed by Heinrich von Ferstel and died here in 1919. His Habsburg heirs sold the palace to the Austrian state of Salzburg.

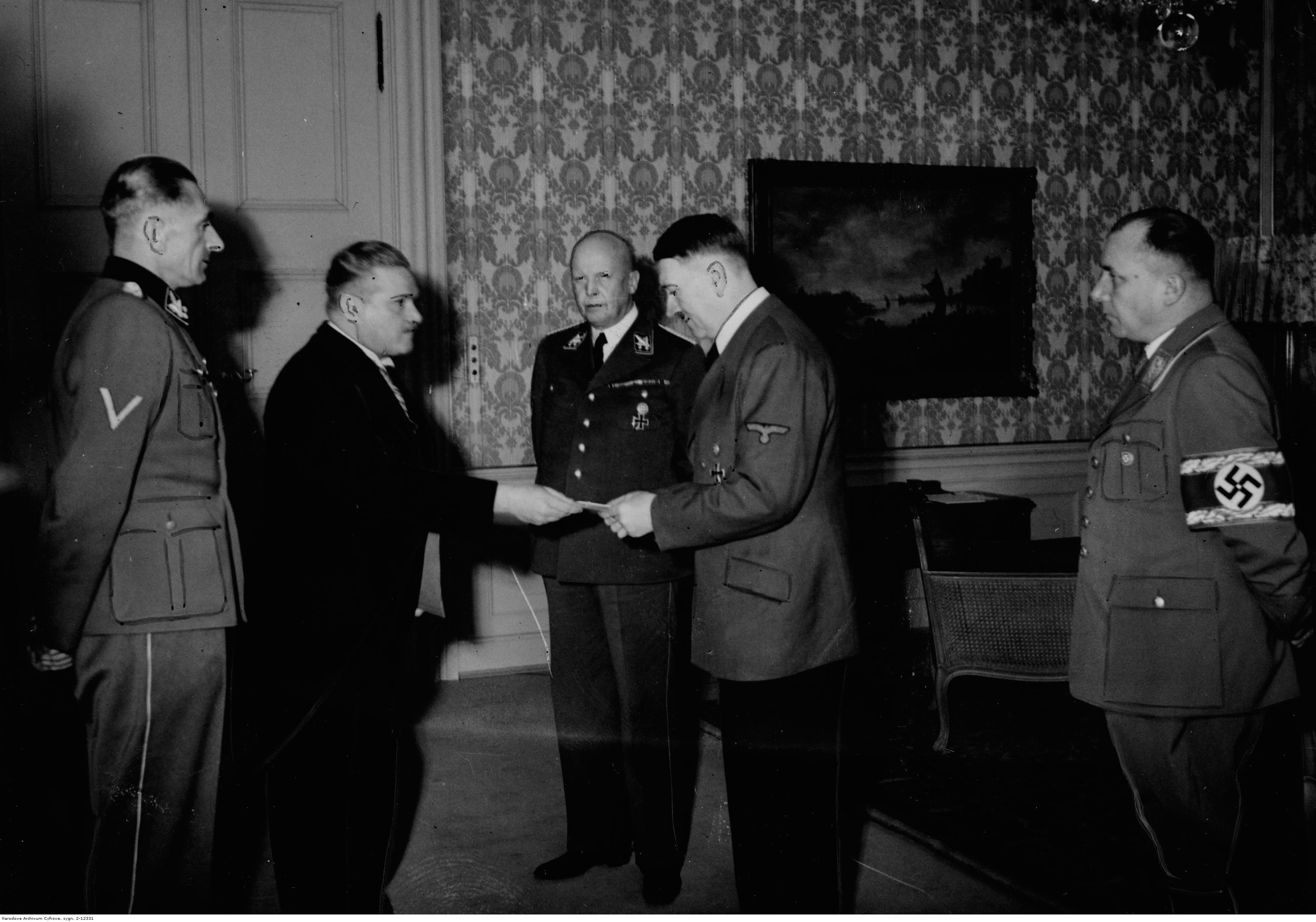
Adolf Hitler and Prime minister Jaroslav Krejčí at the celebration of the fifth anniversary of the Protectorate of Bohemia and Moravia held at Klessheim Castle. 15 March 1944

After the Austrian Anschluss in 1938, Adolf Hitler, when staying at his nearby Berghof residence, used Schloss Klessheim for conferences and to host official guests like Benito Mussolini, Miklós Horthy, Ion Antonescu, Jozef Tiso and Ante Pavelić. While Horthy stayed at Klessheim, Hitler on 19 March 1944 secretly gave orders for Operation Margarethe to occupy Hungary and enforce the deportation of the Hungarian Jews to Auschwitz. On 7 July 1944, on the occasion of a weapons exhibition, an attempt by several Wehrmacht officers around von Stauffenberg to kill Hitler failed, when conspirator Hellmuth Stieff did not trigger the bomb. In May 1945 it was seized by the American military administration. Reichsadler statues made of limestone, that were attached to the entrance portals, were a reminder of the Nazi era.

After the war, Schloss Klessheim was restored to the State of Salzburg. During the Cold War, the neutral Austrian government used it to hold conferences and to host international guests, among them US President Richard Nixon, who on his way to Moscow met there with Chancellor Bruno Kreisky on 20 May 1972. Since 1993 it has been the home of the Salzburg casino, which used to be situated on the Mönchsberg.

The castle also appeared in the 1965 film The Great Race with Jack Lemmon, Tony Curtis and Peter Falk.

== See also ==
- German Resistance

== Literature ==
- Reinhard Medicus: "Das höchfürstliche Schloss Favoritta zu Klesheimb und sein alter Park," in: Bastei – Zeitschrift des Stadtvereines Salzburg für die Erhaltung und Pflege von Bauten, Kultur und Gesellschaft. 55 Jg. Salzburg 2006. 1. Folge, S. 10–17.
