= Holy Trinity Church, Salzburg =

Coordinates: 47°48′11″N 13°02′41″E

Holy Trinity Church
- Dreifaltigkeitskirche
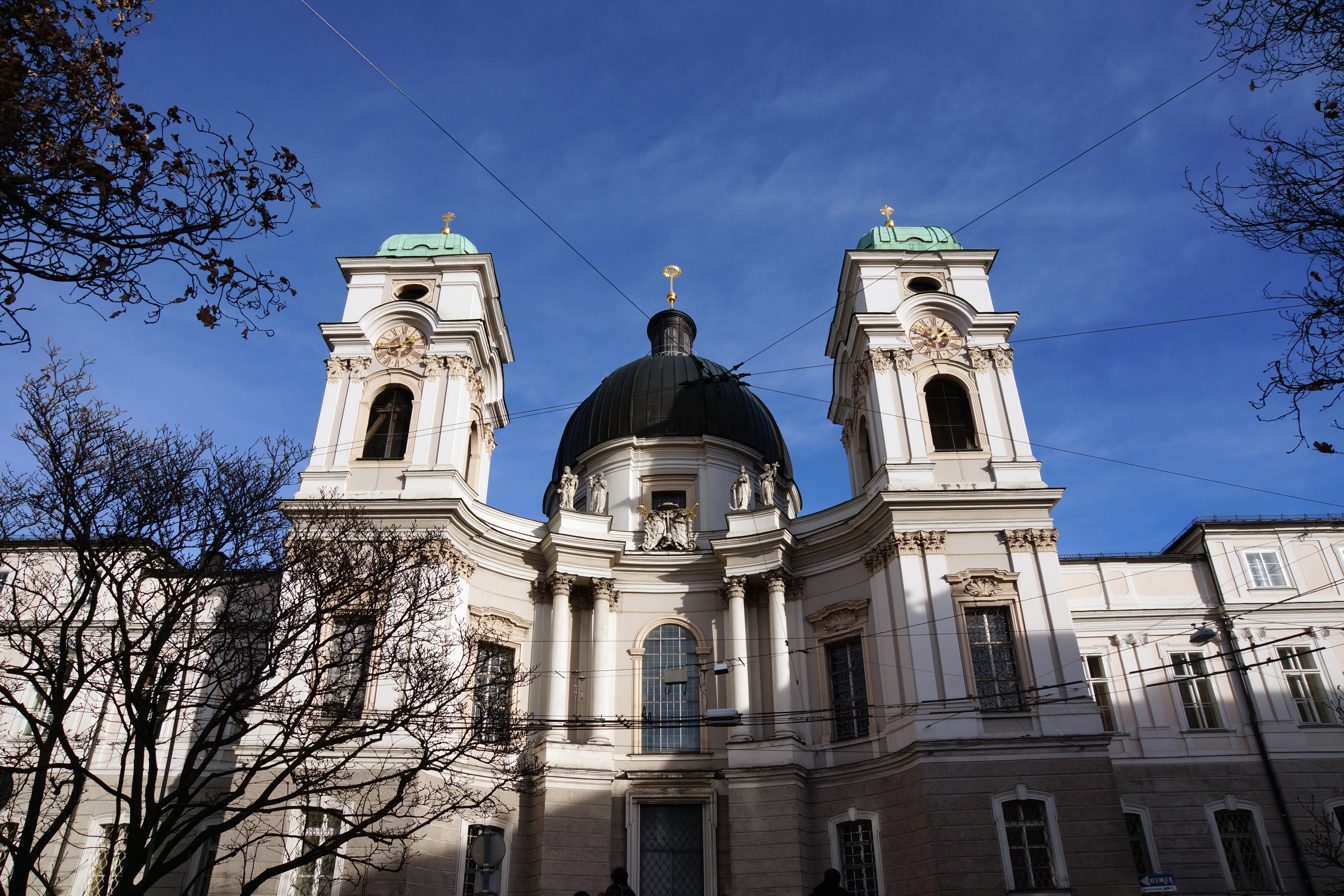
- Holy Trinity Church
- Location: Dreifaltigkeitsgasse 14, Salzburg
- Country: Austria
- Denomination: Roman Catholic

History
- Consecrated: 1699

Architecture
- Architect: Johann Bernhard Fischer von Erlach
- Architectural type: Baroque
- Years built: 1694–1702
- Completed: 1702

Administration
- Diocese: Salzburg

Clergy
- Archbishop: Franz Lackner
- Bishop: Georg Eder

The Holy Trinity Church (German: Dreifaltigkeitskirche) is a Roman Catholic church in Salzburg, Austria. It was designed by Johann Bernhard Fischer von Erlach.

== History ==
The church is designed as a central building and was built in the years 1694–1702. Authority of the church and the seminary was the founder Prince Archbishop Johann Ernst von Thun. The contract was carried out in 1694, the consecration of the partly unfinished church took place in 1699. The church, together with the same time build St. John's Church (hospital church) the first building designed by Johann Bernhard Fischer von Erlach in Salzburg. He used as models various religious buildings in Rome—especially Francesco Borromini's Church Sant'Agnese in Agone in Piazza Navona. While the church is characterized by a discreet use of decorative elements, the entire structure conveys a palatial impression. In addition to Fischer von Erlach and Bernhard Michael Mandl, who created the dome murals, the following sculptors and stonemasons also contributed: Wolf Weißkirchner, Mathias Wilhelm Weißkirchner, Sebastian Stumpfegger, Andreas Götzinger, and Lorenz Dräxl.

== Exterior ==
The construction of the Holy Trinity Church did not originally take place on Hannibal Square (present-day Makart Square), but on a narrow side street between the outer mountain road (present-day Rainerstraße) and the Linzergasse. The pawnshop situated directly opposite the church was demolished in 1907, leaving the elevated church forecourt facing Dreifaltigkeitsgasse, forming the upper end of the Makart Square.

The original steeples were much lower than the present-day steeples, which were later increased for a better visibility of the church behind the pawnshop. The belfries were built in 1757, and the chief cupola towers were added after the fire of Neustadt in 1818. The overall image of the church was improved by the expanding of the towers. The church is the architectural center of a sprawling complex with the two great wings of the seminary forming a uniformly composed façade with the central church representing the powerful central drum dome of the church.

The outer church portal is supported on the parapet in front of the dome on twin columns bearing four figures, three of which symbolize the theological virtues—Faith, Hope, and Love. The fourth figure represents Divine Wisdom. All four characters have been designed by Bernhard Michael Mandl. Between the figures is the double coat of arms of the Prince Archbishop Johann Ernst von Thun, connected to the Salzburger country coat of arms.

== Interior ==
The church interior is a longitudinal oval room with four short barrel vaults with crossed arms, which are surmounted by the large drum dome. The monumental effect of the interior arises mainly from the simplicity of the building and the towering height of the dominant drum dome. The design is reminiscent of the inner shape of the Karlskirche in Vienna, which was the second sacral masterpiece by Fischer von Erlach.

The large dome fresco inside the church, Coronation of the Virgin, was executed by Johann Michael Rottmayr between 1697 and 1700. It was Rottmayr's first sacral dome fresco and shows the Coronation of the Virgin by the Holy Trinity with the assistance of the Archangel Michael, as well as other saints, angels, prophets, the ten holy popes, and the Church patriarch. The fresco sums up the Christian salvation and church history impressively together. The figures are grouped in concentrically arranged cloud banks. At the top lantern a Holy Spirit dove is present. The large dome fresco completes the impression of Baroque ecclesia triumphans, the triumphant Church, within the meaning of Baroque self-understanding of the church building.

The stucco work by Andrea Sallari and Johann Baptist Redi is limited in the main room to the capitals, and in the cross arms stucco boxes. The high altar was created in 1700 according to plans by Fischer von Erlach. It was revised in 1841, but was returned to its original state in 1947. The altar contains a sculptural group of the Trinity group with two adoring angels. The reliquary of St. Ernestus was designed in 1959 by Otto Prossinger. The two side altars contain magnificent life-size angels, which were designed by Fischer von Erlach and Michael Bernhard Mandl from 1700–02. The Marie miraculous image of the right side altar dates from the sixteenth century. The Baroque frame was carried out by Sebastian Stumpfegger.

== See also ==
- 18th-century Western domes
