= Johann Bernhard Fischer von Erlach =

Austrian architect (1656–1723)

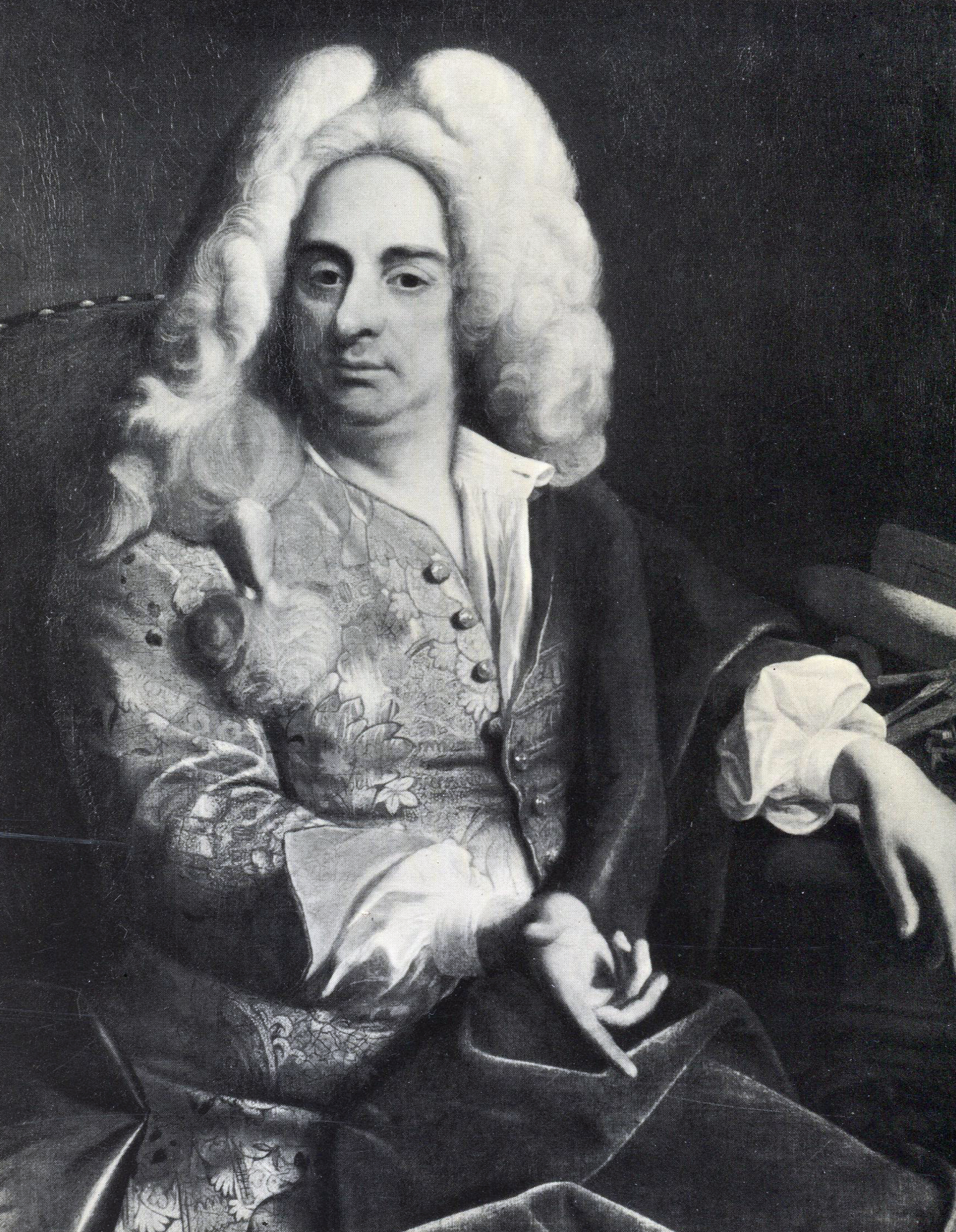
- Portrait by Ádám Mányoki, c. 1723
- Born: 20 July 1656; Graz
- Died: 5 April 1723 (aged 66); Vienna
- Occupation: Architect
- Buildings: Schönbrunn Palace; Karlskirche; Austrian National Library; Schloss Klessheim; Holy Trinity Church; Kollegienkirche

Johann Bernhard Fischer von Erlach (20 July 1656 – 5 April 1723) was an Austrian architect, sculptor, engraver, and architectural historian whose Baroque architecture profoundly influenced and shaped the tastes of the Habsburg Empire. His influential book A Plan of Civil and Historical Architecture (1721) was one of the first and most popular comparative studies of world architecture. His major works include Schönbrunn Palace, Karlskirche, and the Austrian National Library in Vienna, and Schloss Klessheim, Holy Trinity Church, and the Kollegienkirche in Salzburg.

== Early life ==
Johann Bernhard Fischer von Erlach was born in Graz and baptized in the parish church of Heiligen Blut on 20 July 1656. His parents came from notable Graz families: his father was a provincial sculptor and artisan, his grandfather was a bookseller, and his mother was the daughter of a joiner and married to a sculptor before her second marriage. Raised in the tradition of Styrian craftsmanship in a city of significant architectural achievements, Johann received his early training as a sculptor in the workshop of his father, Johann Baptist Fischer, who contributed to the interior sculptural decorations of the Landhaus and Eggenberg Palace in Graz. During the seventeenth century, the Princes of Eggenberg had emerged as important patrons of the arts in Styria; through their patronage of Johann Baptist, they arranged for his talented son to travel to Italy and work in the flourishing artistic environment of the late Italian Baroque.

The "casket of St. John Nepomuk" refers to the magnificent silver tomb in Prague's St. Vitus Cathedral, designed by Joseph Emanuel Fischer von Erlach (not his father, Johann Bernhard) and sculpted by Antonio Corradini, with initial designs dating back to the elder Fischer von Erlach around 1729-1730. The elaborate Baroque monument, completed in 1736, holds the remains of the saint and symbolizes his martyrdom, featuring two tons of silver and becoming a significant pilgrimage site.

In 1671, at the age of sixteen, Johann moved to Rome and joined the workshop of his fellow Austrian Johann Paul Schor and of the great Gian Lorenzo Bernini, who gave him ample opportunities to study both ancient and modern sculpture and architecture. By 1685, he had followed Schor to Naples, where he was reported to have amassed a considerable fortune serving the Spanish viceroy.

Back in Austria in 1687, Fischer von Erlach was installed as a fashionable and sought-after architect. Commissions were plentiful, as royalty and highest echelons of aristocracy sought to repair the damage inflicted on their country residences by the Ottoman Turks in the course of their 1683 campaign. Fischer's understanding of an urbane Baroque idiom appeared superior to that prevalent in Central Europe, and in 1687 he secured the key position of court architect, which he would retain in the service of three emperors.

== Service under Emperor Joseph I ==
During the 1690s, which have been described as the most fruitful period of Fischer's career, he adapted the Italian Baroque to local needs and traditions. In 1690, he won great acclaim for two temporary triumphal arches constructed in Vienna to celebrate Joseph I's coronation. He later personally instructed Joseph in architectural arts, so successfully that in 1696 the monarch elevated Johann Fischer to the nobility, as Johann Bernhard Fischer von Erlach.

In his 17th-century designs and commissions, Fischer von Erlach embraced Berniniesque's powerful curving lines, seeking to convey a sense of movement. His other inspirations included Mansart's country residences and the Palladian classical villas, which he would study during his journeys to Prussia, the Netherlands, England in 1704 and Venice in 1707.

Thus Fischer presided over the genesis and early evolution of a distinctive brand of Baroque architecture, which would shape the architectural tastes of the Austrian aristocracy for decades to come. His emblematic design from the 1690s was the Winter Palace of Prince Eugene of Savoy, commenced in 1695 in Vienna. As Hans Aurenhammer put it, this edifice represented "a new type of town palace characterized by impressive form, structural clarity, and the dynamic tension of its decoration".

== Salzburg and late works ==
Fischer's expertise in town planning made itself felt in designs he executed for the Archbishop of Salzburg. Particularly accomplished are two churches, the Holy Trinity Church (Dreifaltigkeitskirche) (1694–1702) and the Kollegienkirche (Collegiate Church) (1696–1707), whose highly pitched domes and towers, convex facades, and dynamic forms irrevocably changed the outline of Salzburg. They say that masses of stone were designed by Fischer so as to give the appearance of billows of cloud and smoke. The archbishop's country seat, Schloss Klessheim (1700–09), was also designed by him.

Fischer's visit to Dalmatia brought back to Western Europe the influence of the classical Diocletian's Palace and provided Europe with one of the first professional architectural glimpses of this notable Roman monument.

After Joseph I's death in 1711, Fischer von Erlach was rarely entrusted with new commissions, as the more pleasing and less demanding designs of his rival Johann Lucas von Hildebrandt proved more popular with the young monarch Charles VI, Holy Roman Emperor and his court. He found an opportunity to draw some of the finest architectural reconstructions of the buildings of Antiquity, which were published in his groundbreaking Plan of Civil and Historical Architecture in 1721. He was also made responsible for various administrative tasks, which would take a large portion of his energy and time.

Clam-Gallas Palace in Prague, commenced in 1713, was one of his last designs for a stately town residence. Much imitated by later architects, the structure highlights Fischer's enthusiasm for Palladian facades, which became ever more pronounced during the last period of his work.

But it is Karlskirche in Vienna, started in 1715, that most fully illustrates his late synthetic style. In this structure, completed by his son Joseph Emanuel, Fischer's ambition was to harmonize the principal elements and ideas that underlie the most significant churches in the history of Western architecture: the Temple of Solomon in Jerusalem, Hagia Sophia in Constantinople, the Pantheon and Saint Peter's Basilica in Rome, the Dome des Invalides in Paris and Saint Paul's Cathedral in London.

== Selected works ==
- Pestsäule, Graben, Vienna, Austria, 1687
- Pilgrimage Church Maria Straßengel high altar, Graz, Austria, 1687
- Ruprecht von Eggenberg mausoleum alterations, Ehrenhausen, Austria, 1690
- Palais Augarten, Vienna, Austria, 1688–92
- Count Schlick summer house, Vienna, Austria, 1692
- Palais Strattman, Vienna, Austria, 1692
- Palais Schönborn-Batthyány, Vienna, Austria, 1692–93
- Schloß Niederweiden hunting lodge, Lower Austria, Austria, 1693
- Pferdeschwemme, Salzburg, 1693
- Hofmarstall stables portal, Salzburg, Austria, 1694
- Schönbrunn Palace, Vienna, Austria, 1695
- Parnas fountain on Zelný trh (Cabbage market), Brno 1696
- Schloss Neuwaldegg, Vienna, Austria, 1697
- Winter Palace of Prince Eugene, Vienna, Austria, 1695–97
- Schloss Klessheim, Salzburg, Austria, 1700
- Pilgrimage Church in Kirchental, Lofer, Salzburg, Austria, 1694–1701
- Holy Trinity Church (Dreifaltigkeitskirche), Salzburg, Austria, 1694–1702
- Johannesspitalskirche, Salzburg, Austria, 1699–1703
- Mariazell Basilica high altar, Mariazell, Austria, 1692–1704
- St. Mark's Church (Markuskirche, formerly Ursulinenkirche), Salzburg, Austria, 1699–1705
- Stadtpalais Liechtenstein side portal, Vienna, Austria, 1705
- Kollegienkirche (Collegiate Church), Salzburg, Austria, 1696–1707
- Franciscan Church high altar, Salzburg, Austria, 1708
- Palais Lobkowitz, Vienna, Austria, 1709–11
- Palais Trautson, Vienna, Austria, 1710–12
- Perchtoldsdorf plague column, Vienna, Austria, 1713
- Bohemian Court Chancellery, Vienna, Austria, 1708–14
- Clam-Gallas Palace, Prague, 1714–18
- Cekin Mansion, Ljubljana, 1720
- Palais Schwarzenberg, Vienna, Austria, 1720–22
- Stallburg, Vienna, Austria, 1723
- Karlskirche, Vienna, Austria, 1716–23
- Wrocław Cathedral electoral chapel, Wrocław, Poland, 1716–24
- Austrian National Library plans, Vienna, Austria, 1723–26

== Gallery ==
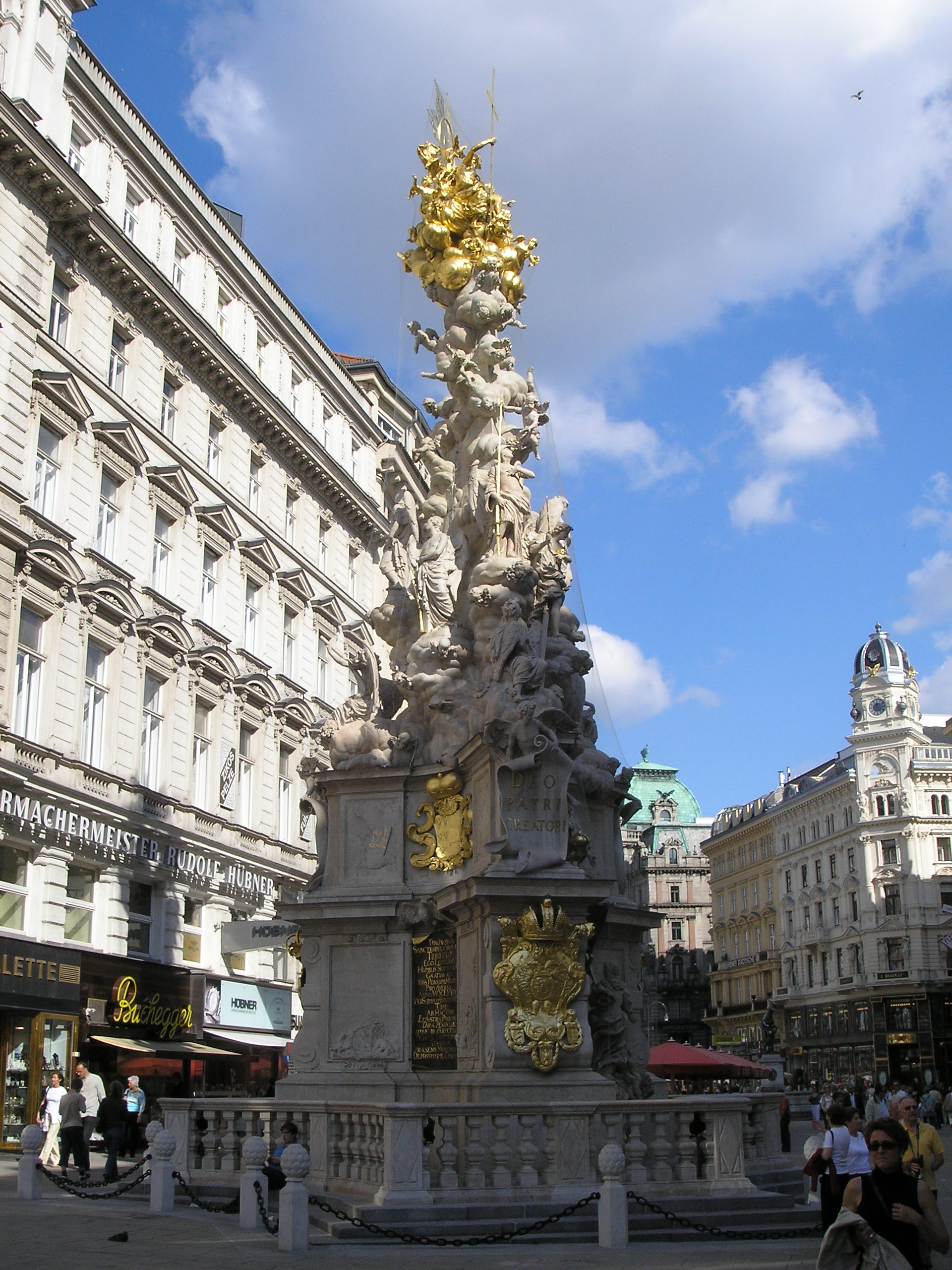
Pestsäule, Graben, Vienna, 1687

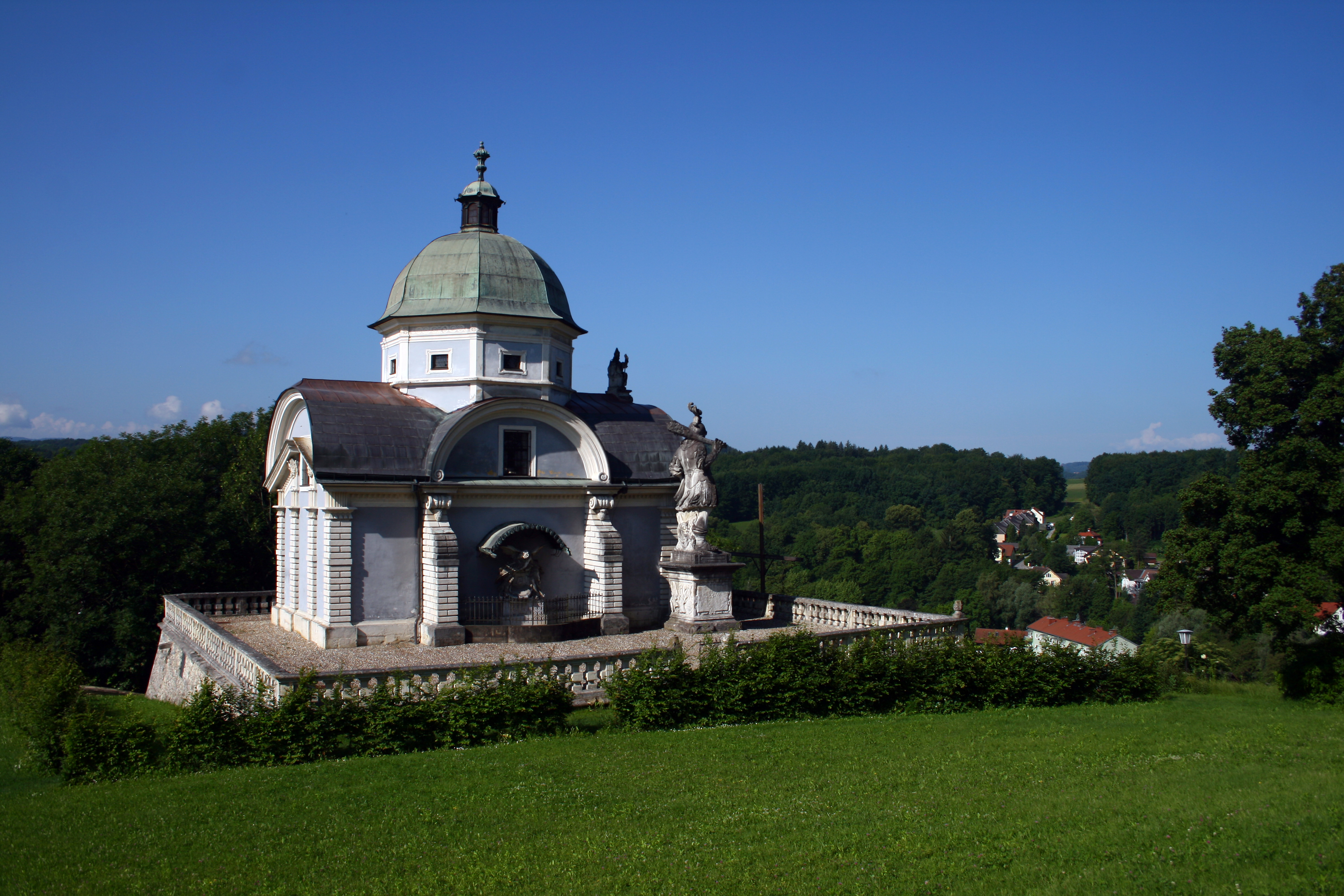
Ruprecht von Eggenberg mausoleum, Styria, 1690

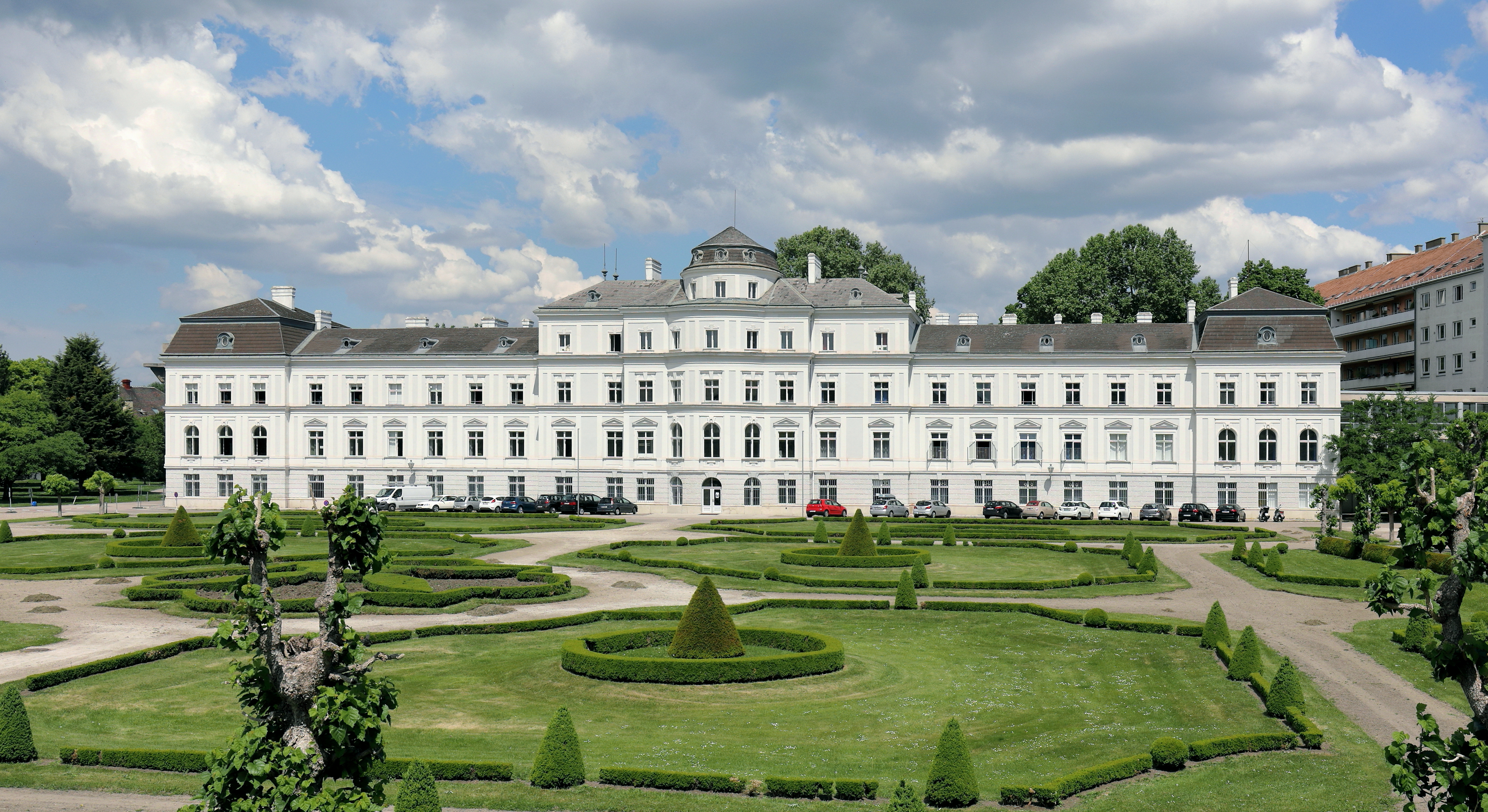
Palais Augarten, Vienna, 1688–92

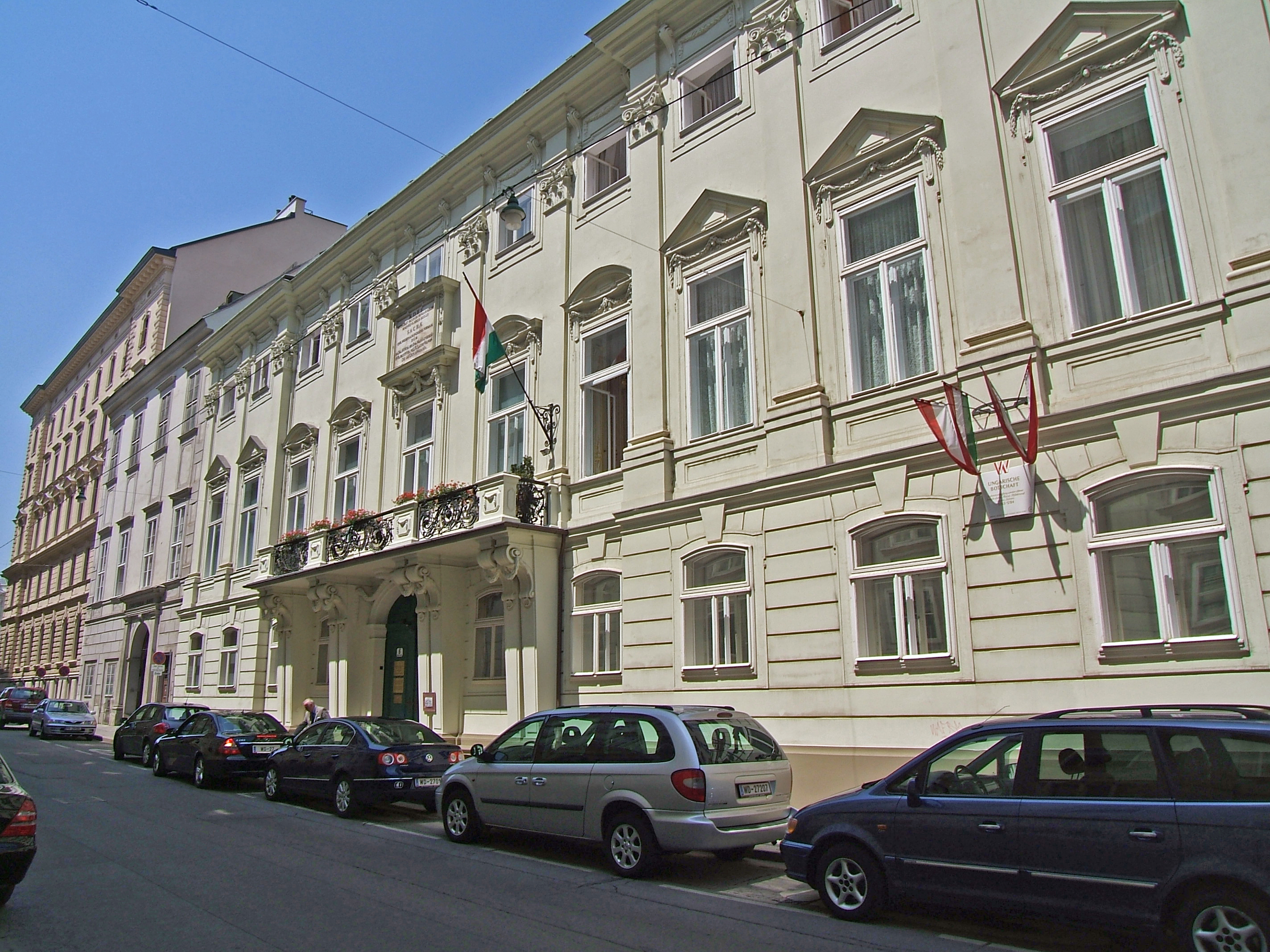
Palais Strattman, Vienna, 1692

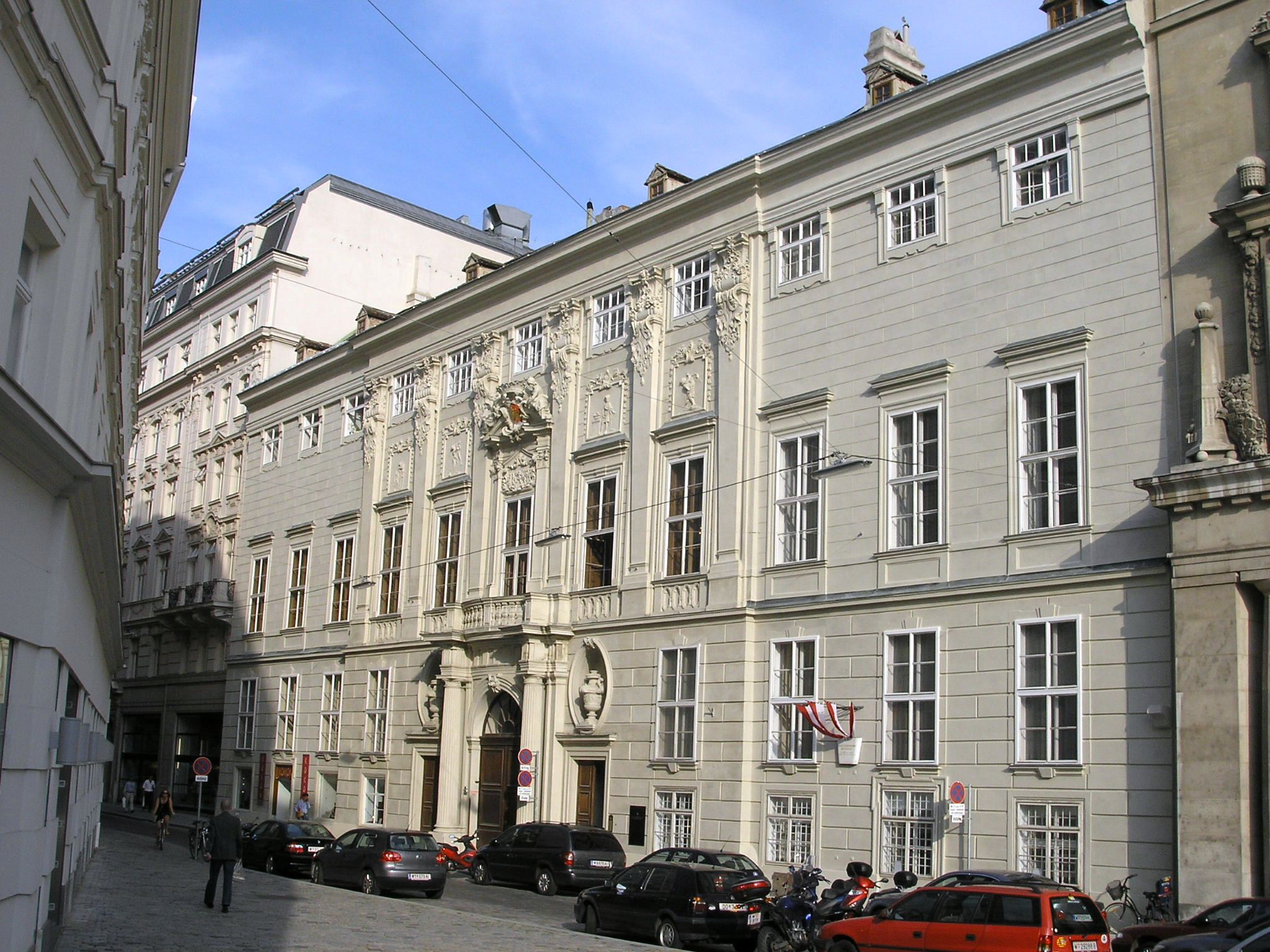
Palais Schönborn-Batthyány, Vienna, 1692–93

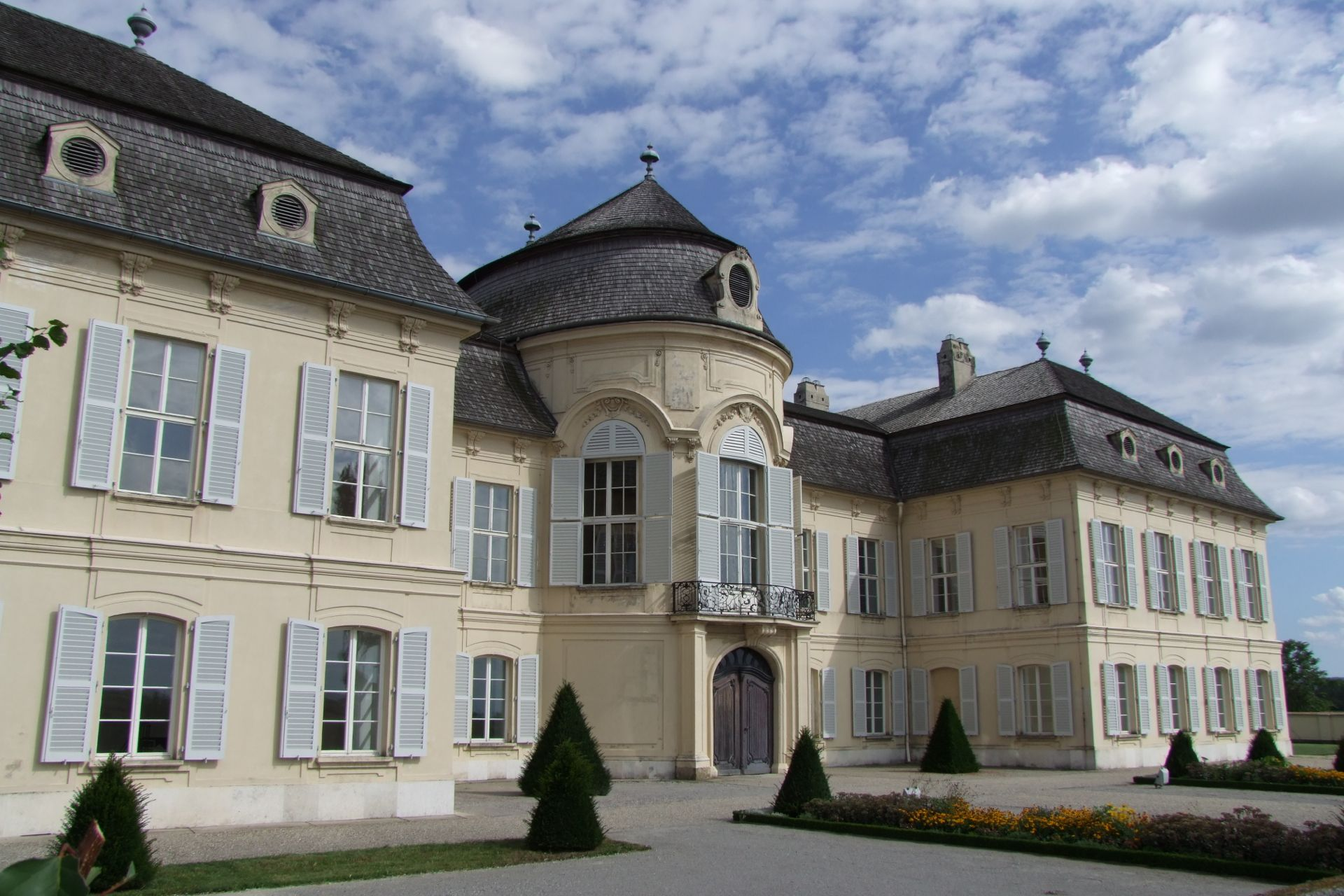
Schloß Niederweiden, Lower Austria, 1693

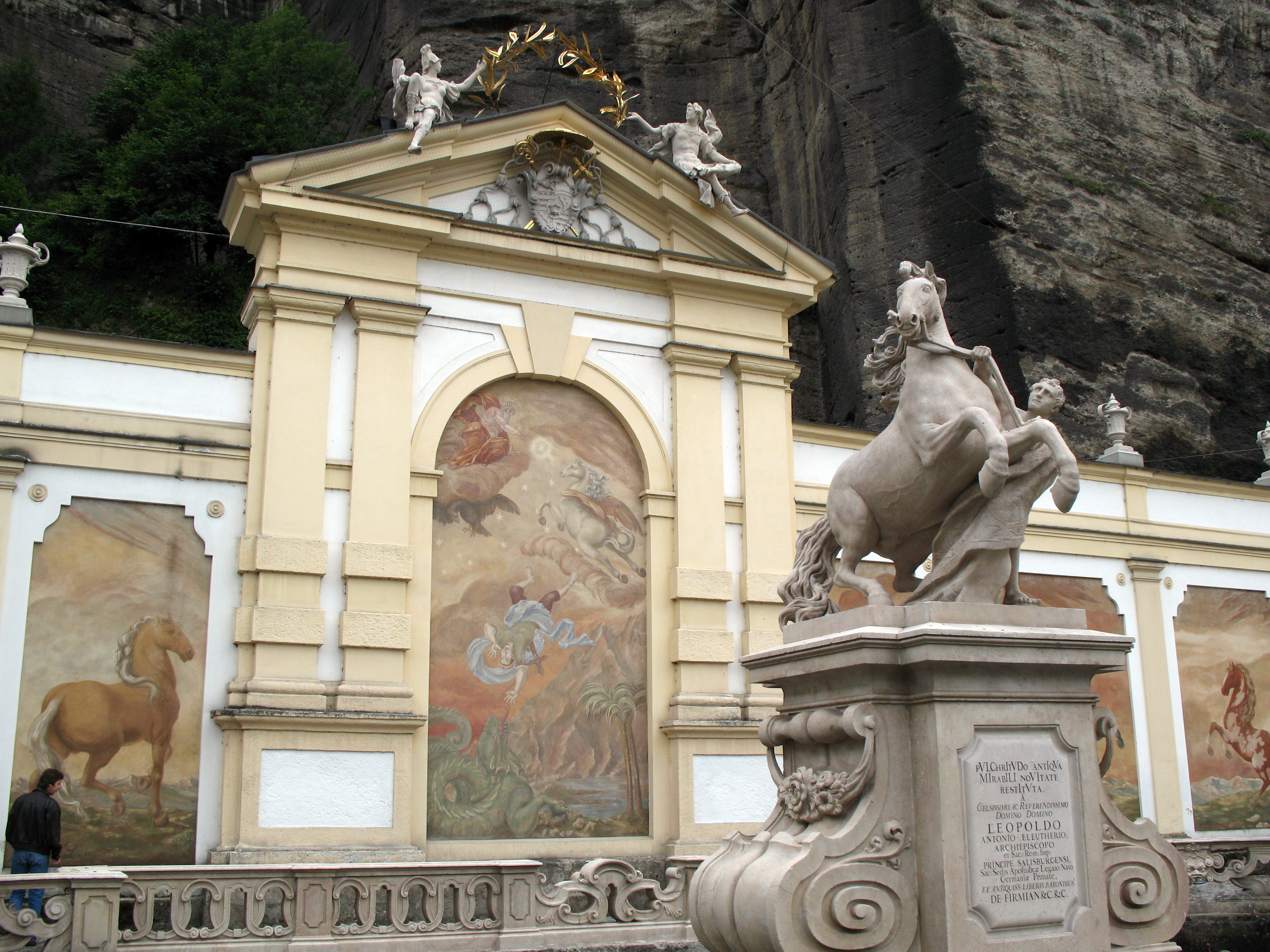
Pferdeschwemme, Salzburg, 1693

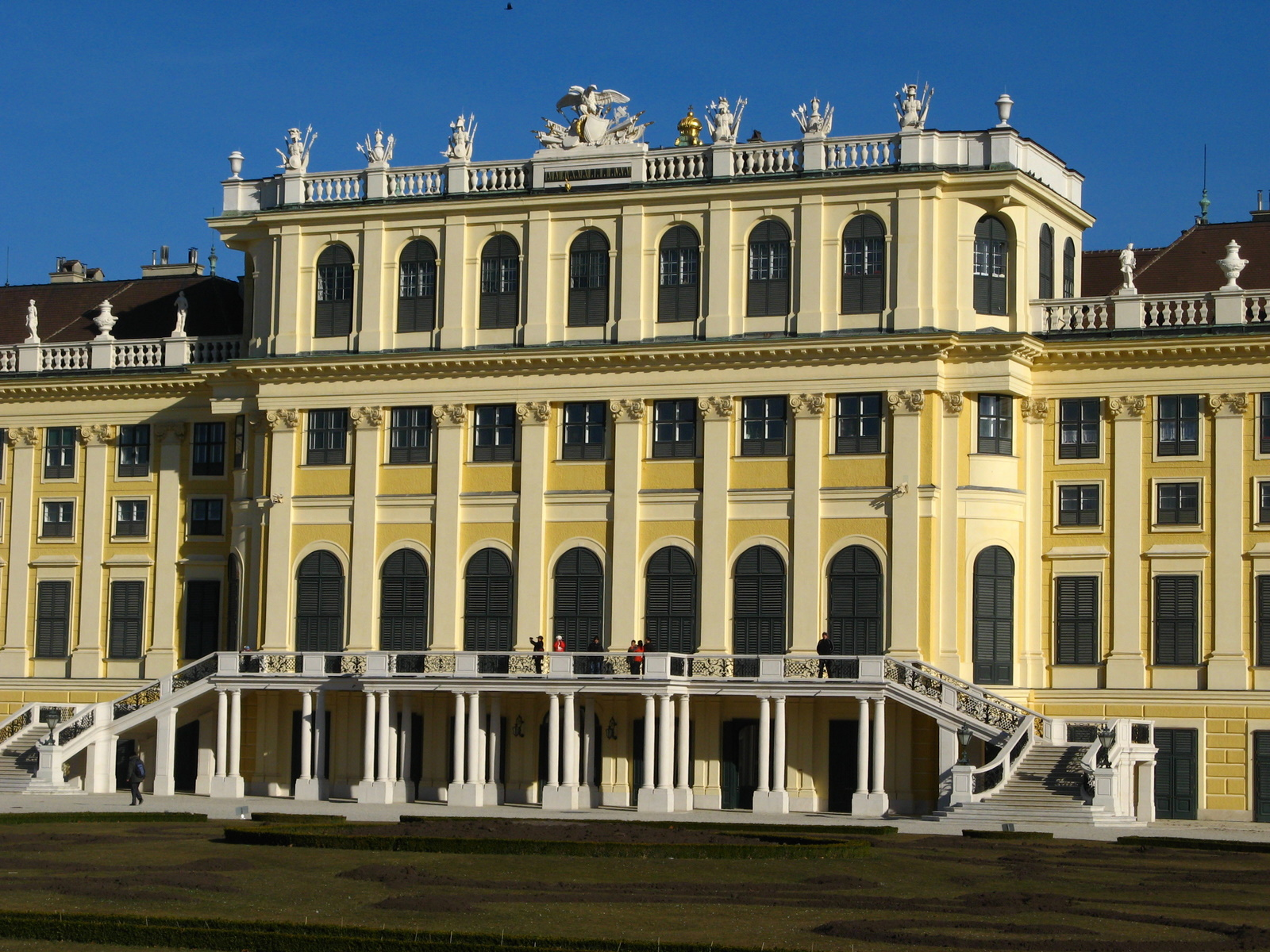
Schönbrunn Palace, Vienna, 1695

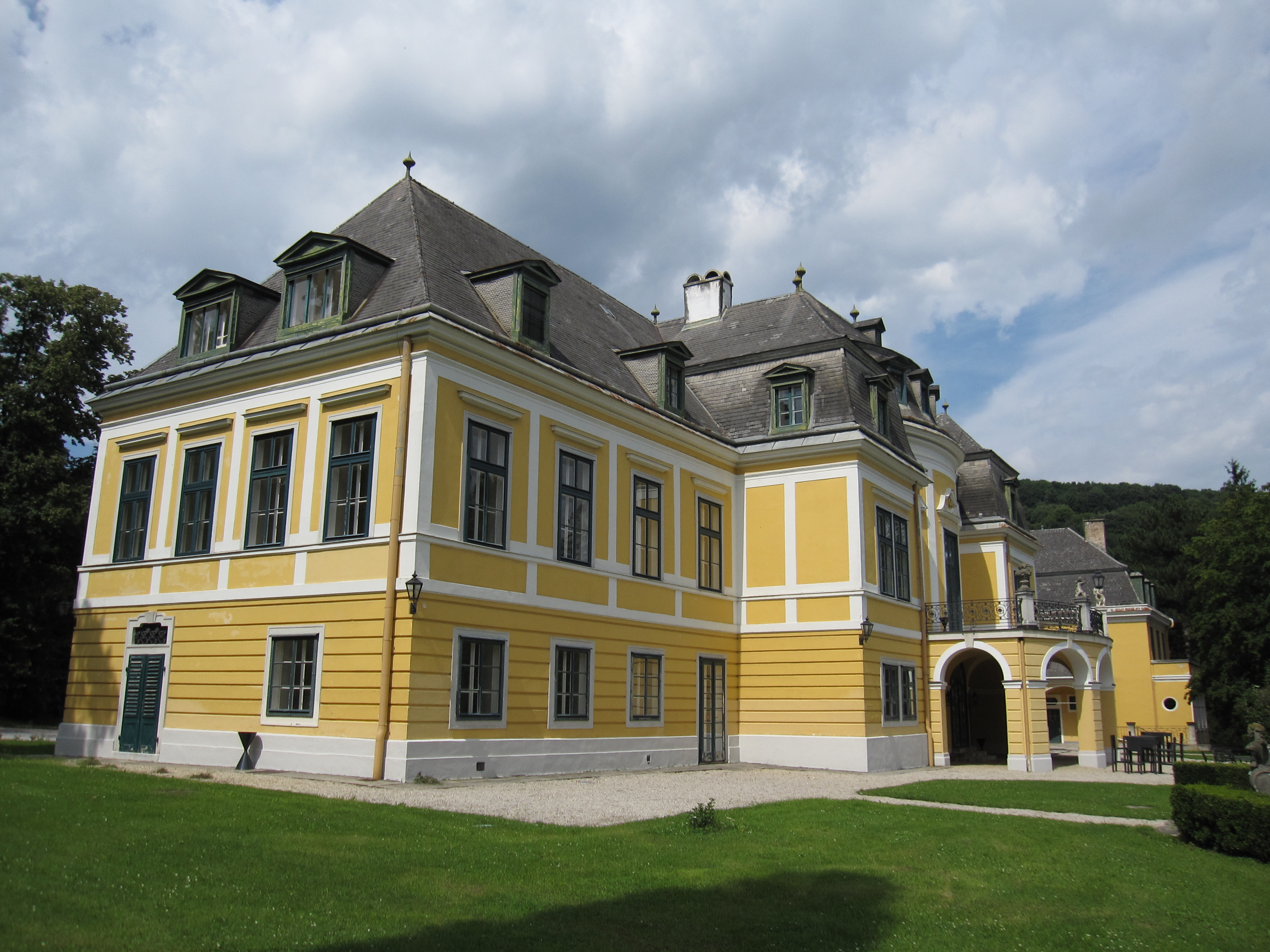
Schloss Neuwaldegg, 1697

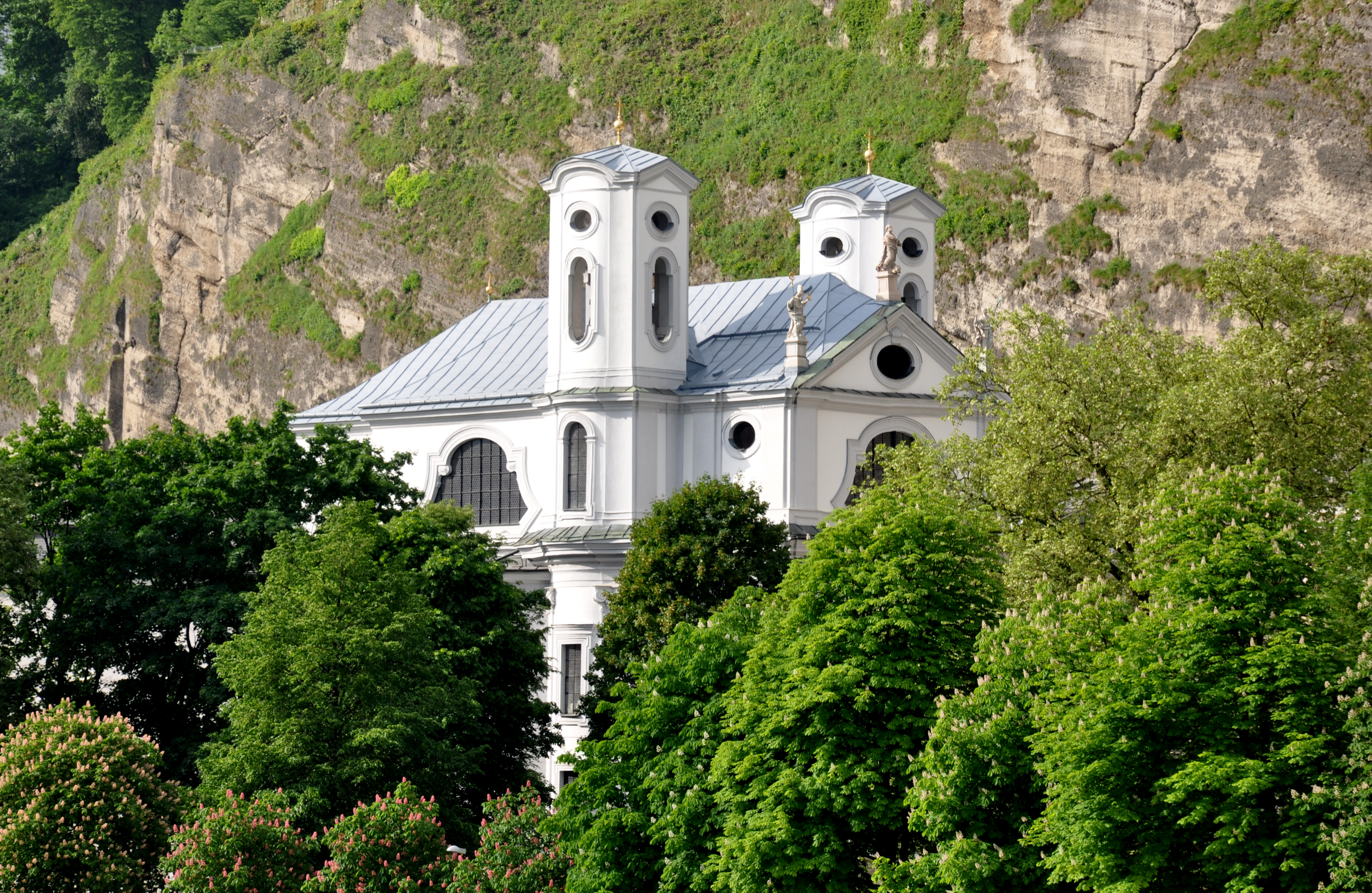
St. Mark's Church, Salzburg, 1699

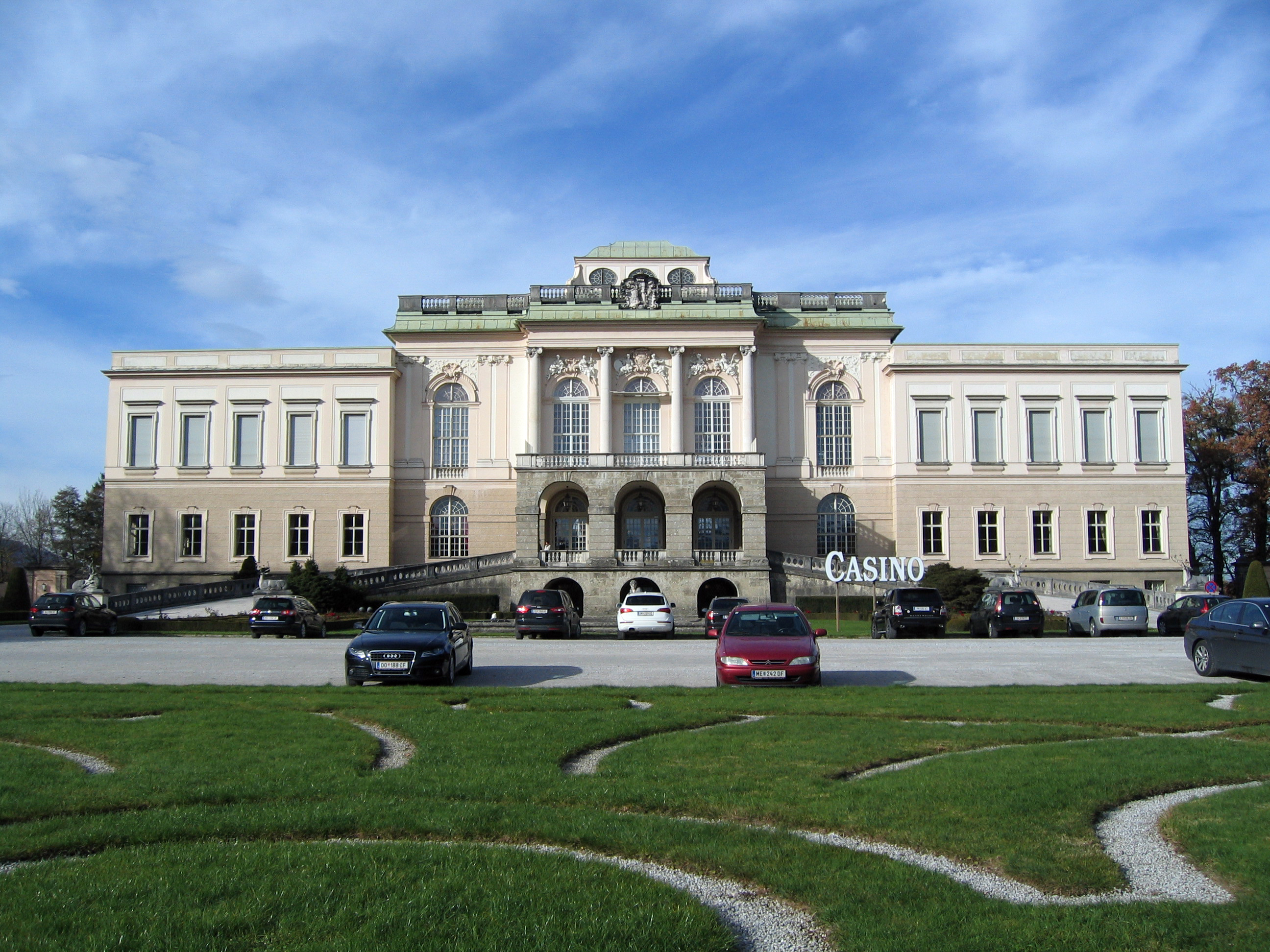
Schloss Klessheim, Salzburg, 1700

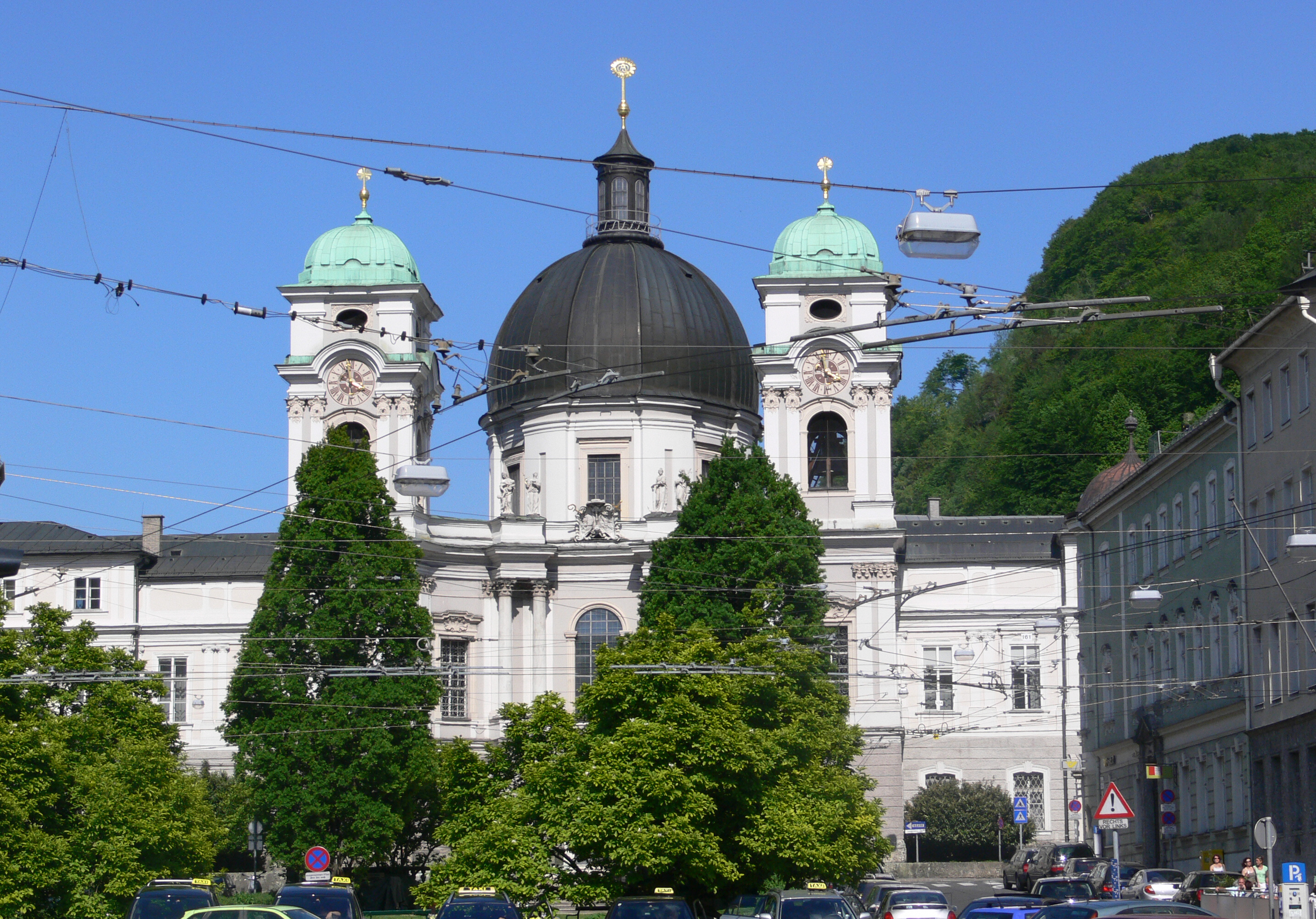
Holy Trinity Church, Salzburg, 1694–1702

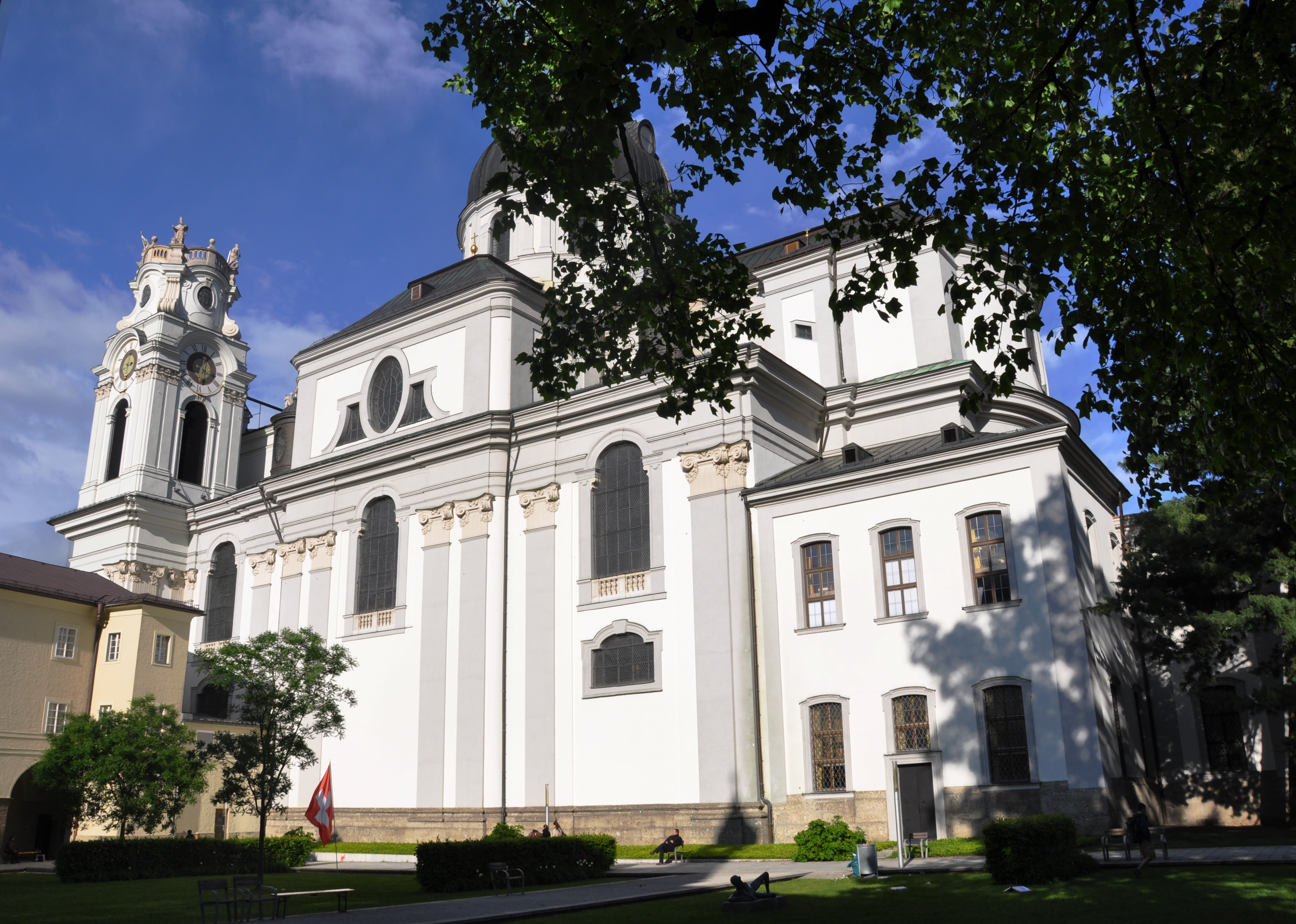
Collegiate Church, Salzburg, 1696–1707

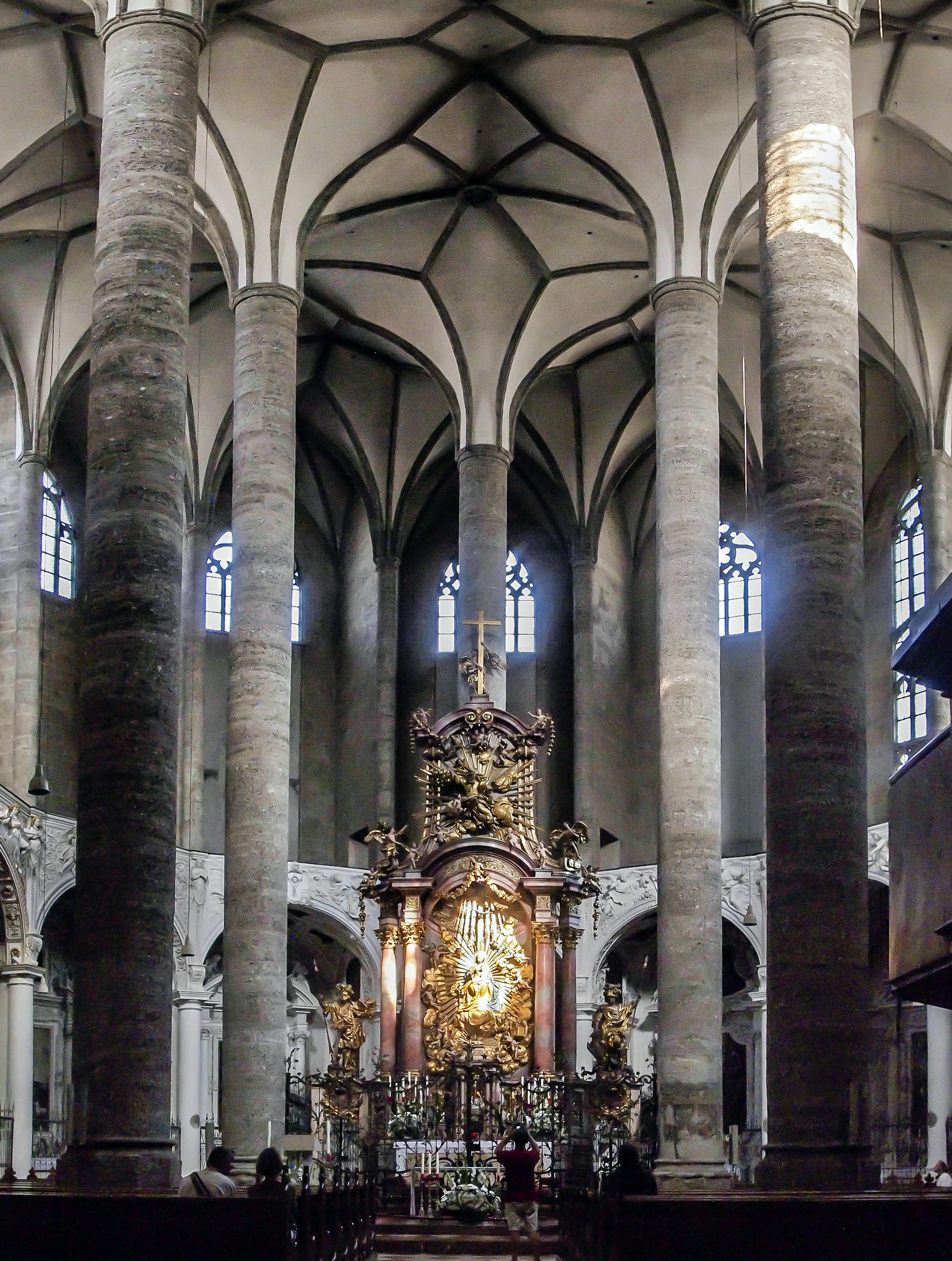
Franciscan Church high altar, Salzburg, 1708

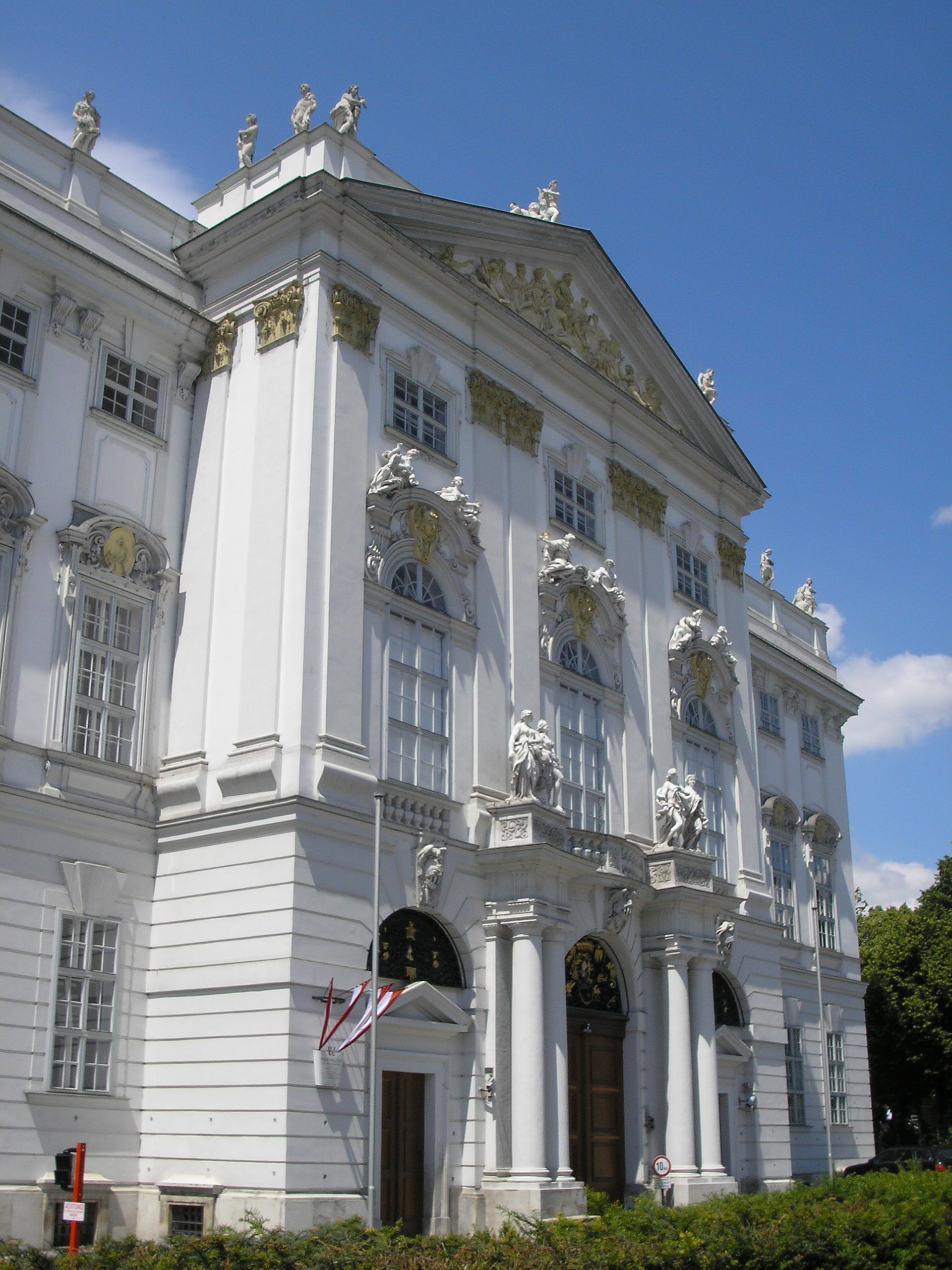
Palais Trautson, Vienna, 1710–12

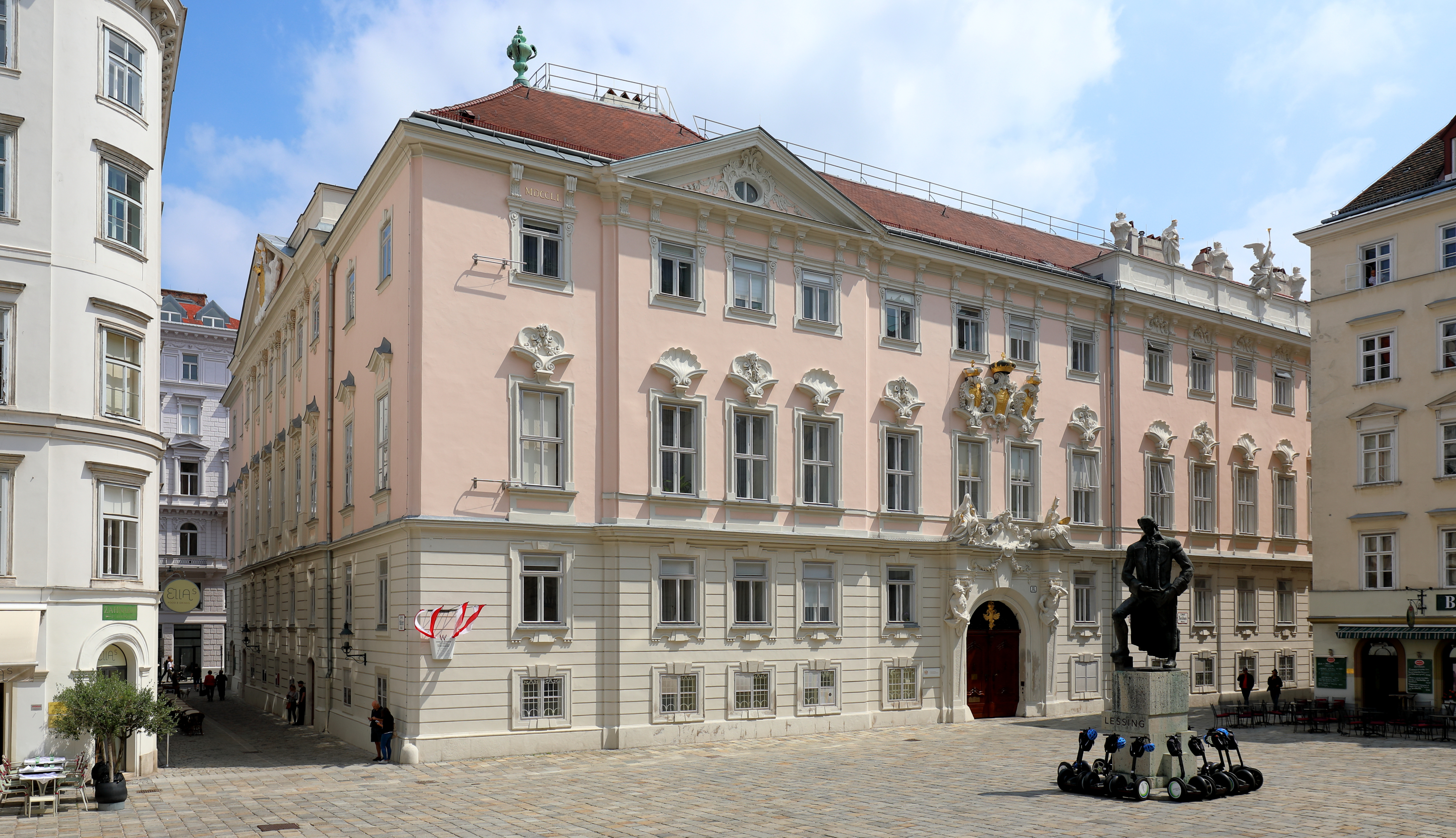
Bohemian Court Chancellery, Vienna, 1708–14

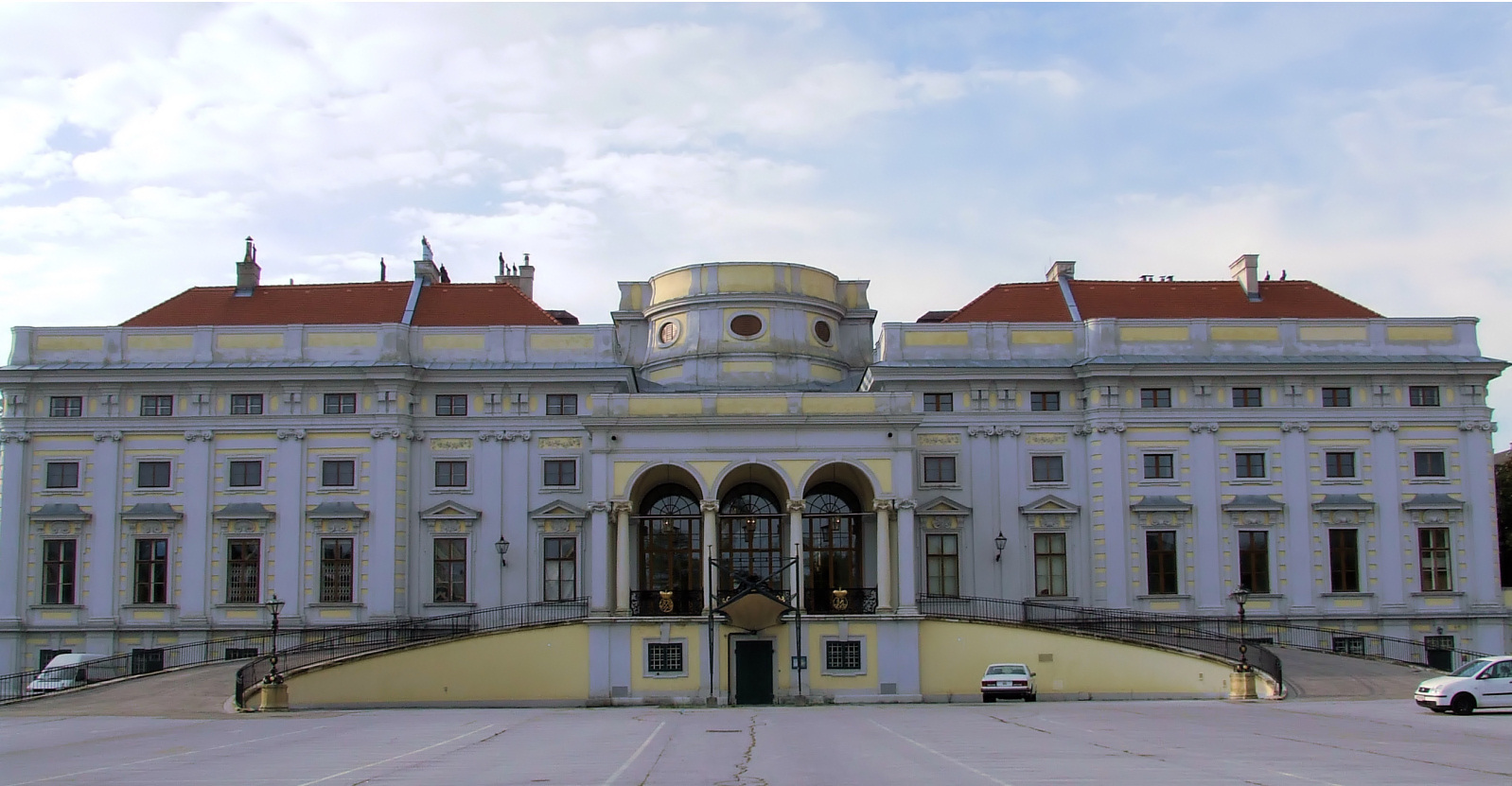
Palais Schwarzenberg, Vienna, 1720–22

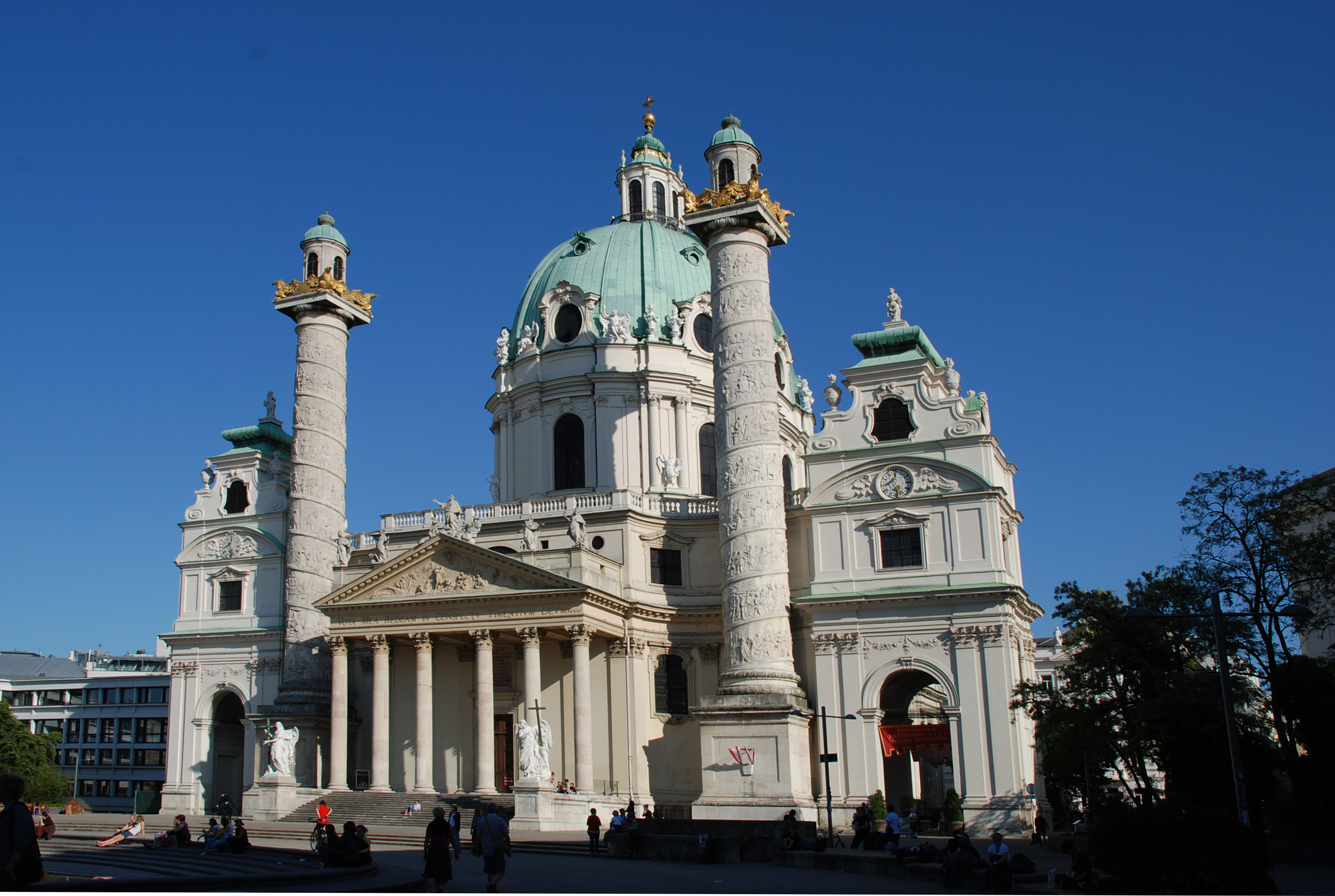
Karlskirche, Vienna, 1716–23

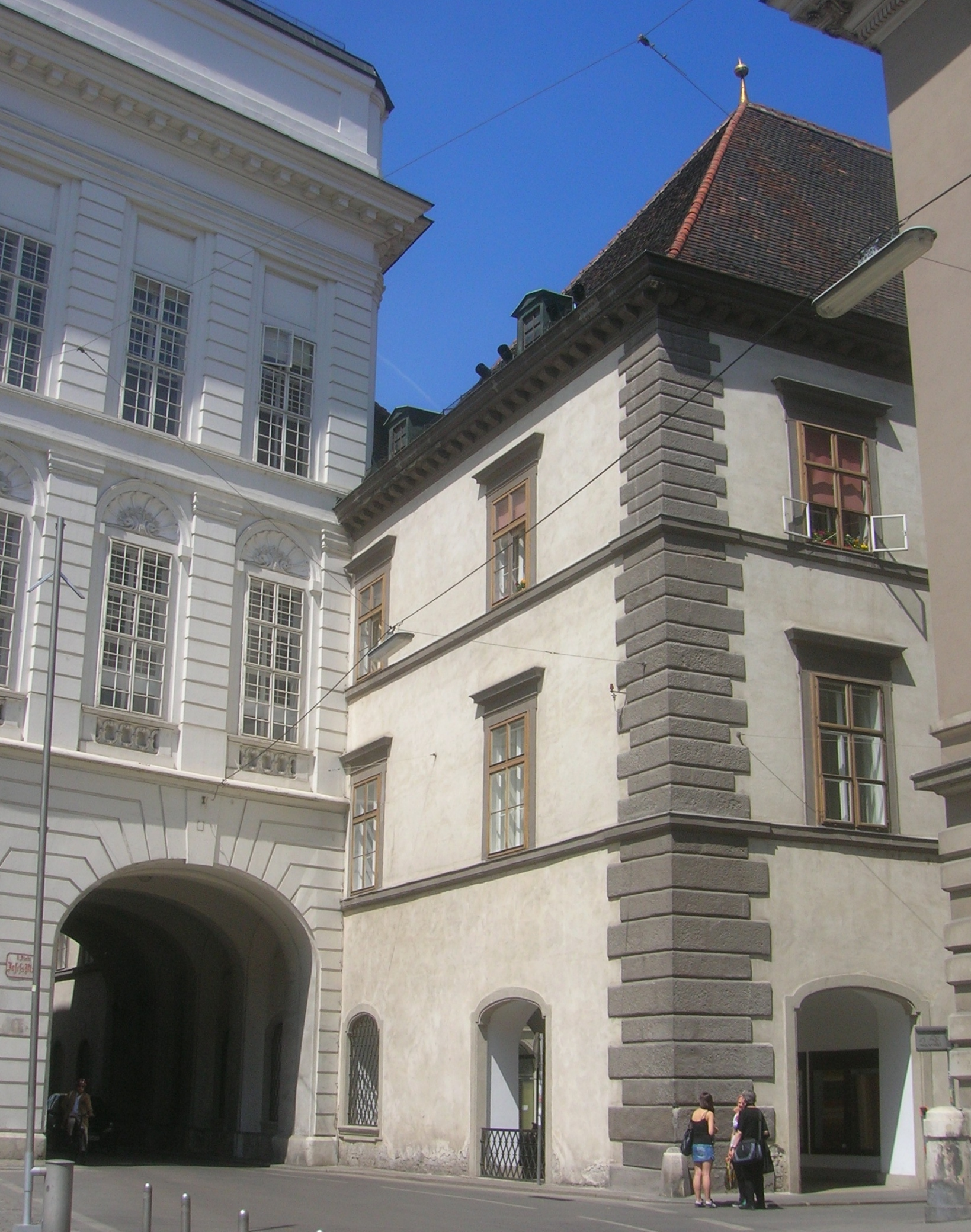
Stallburg, 1723

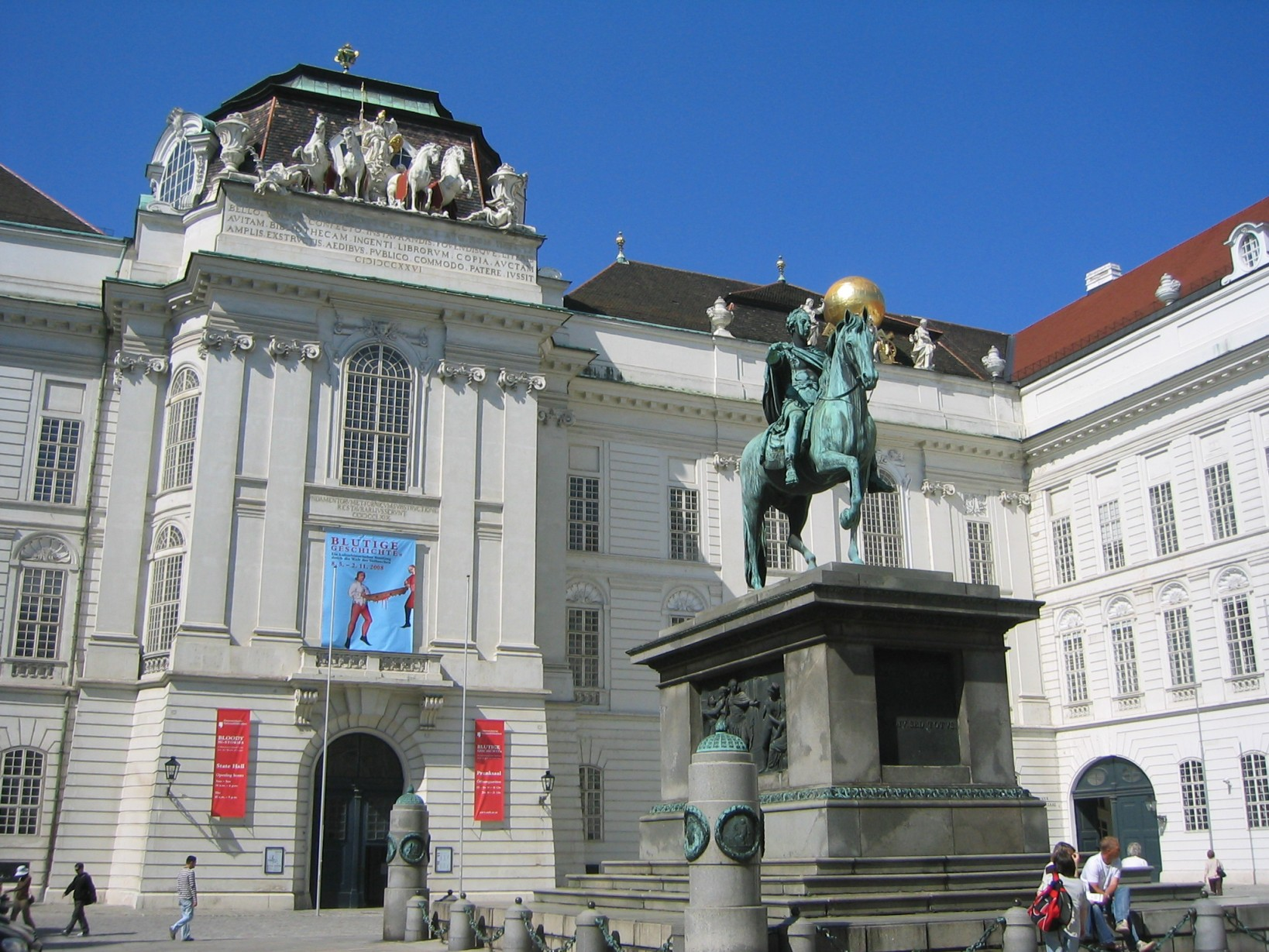
Austrian National Library, Vienna, 1723–26
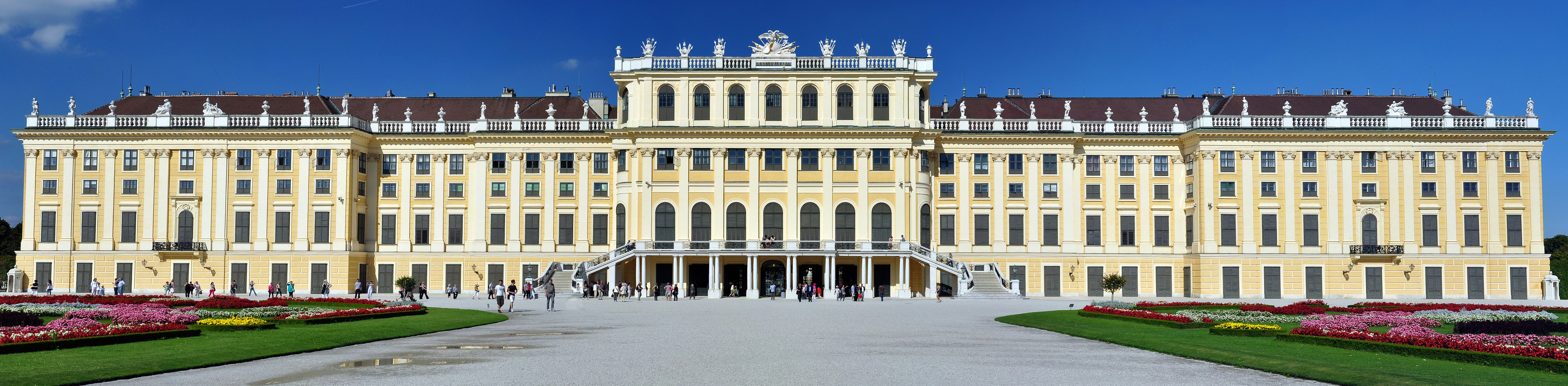
Schönbrunn Palace
