= Carrara marble =

Type of white or blue-grey marble popular for use in sculpture and building decor

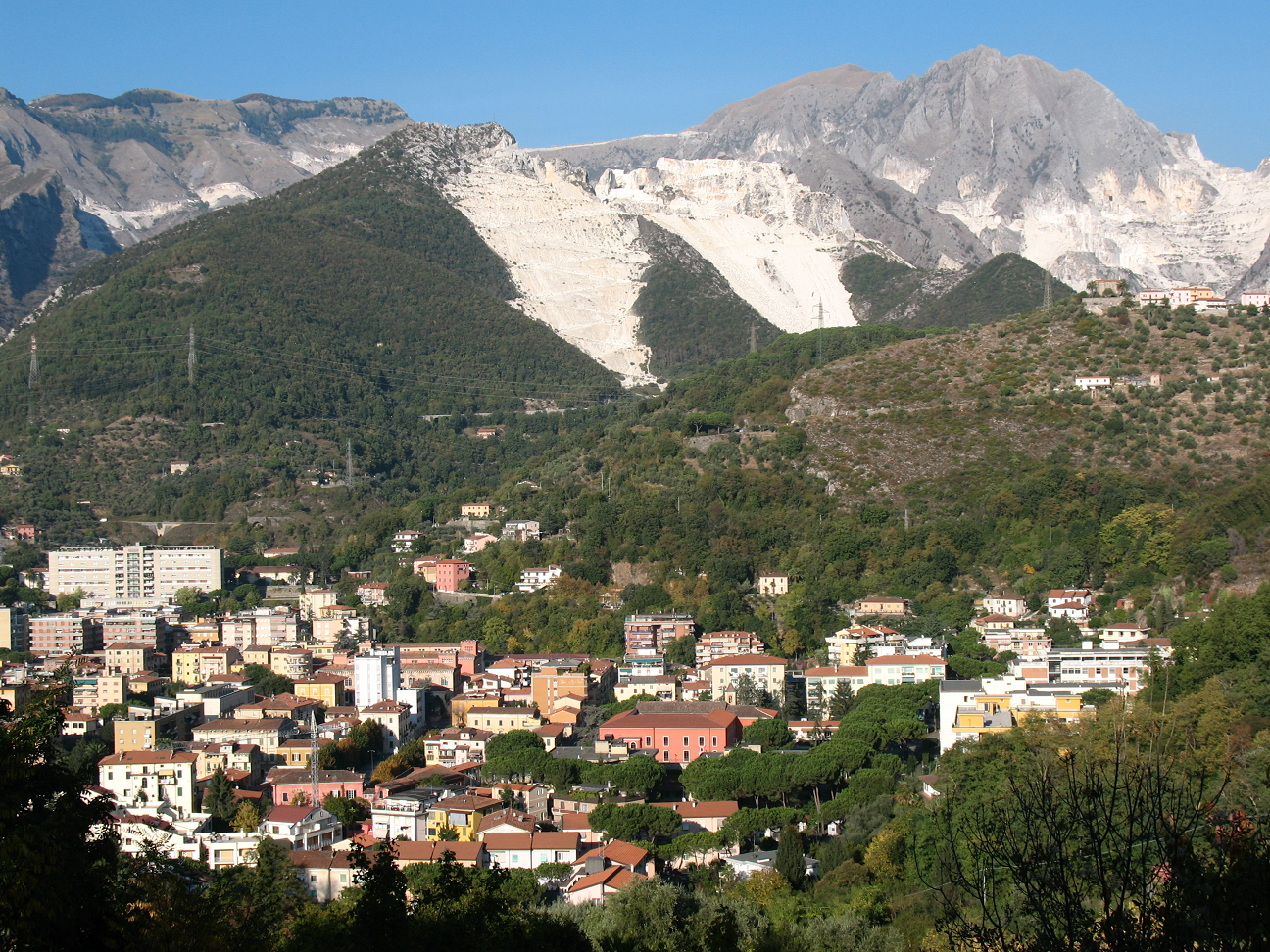
View of Carrara; the white on the mountains behind is quarried faces of marble.

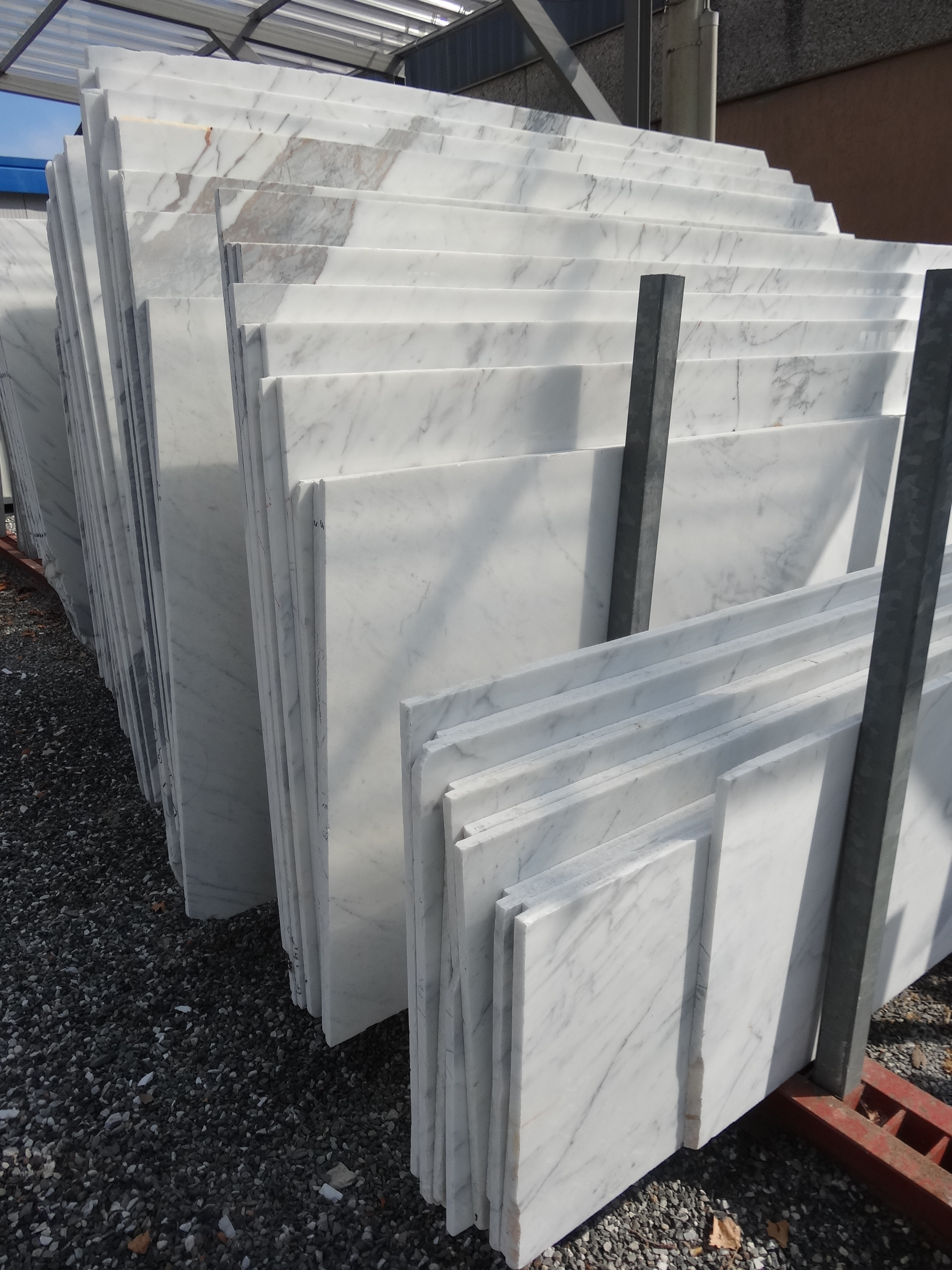
Sample sheets, 2016

Carrara marble is a type of white or blue-grey marble popular for use in sculpture and building decor. It has been quarried since Roman times in the mountains of Carrara, a city in the province of Massa and Carrara in the north of Tuscany, Italy.

More marble has been extracted from the over 650 quarry sites near Carrara than from any other place. The pure white statuario grade, now exhausted, was used for monumental sculpture, as "it has a high tensile strength, can take a high gloss polish and holds very fine detail".

== History ==
Carrara marble has been used since the time of Ancient Rome, when it was called marmor lunense, or "Luna marble".

In the Middle Ages, most of the quarries were owned by the Marquis Malaspina who in turn rented them to families of Carrara masters who managed both the extraction and transport of the precious material. Some of them, such as the Maffioli, who rented some quarries north of Carrara, in the Torano area, or, around 1490, Giovanni Pietro Buffa, who bought marble on credit from local quarrymen and then resold it on the Venetian market, were able to create a dense commercial network, exporting the marble even to distant locations. Just to cite an example, starting from 1474, first the Maffioli, then the Buffa, supplied the marble for the facade of the Certosa di Pavia, also taking care of the transport of the material which, by ship, after having circumnavigated Italy, reached the construction site of the monastery after having sailed up the Po and the Ticino by boat. Starting from the 16th century, Genoese stonecutters-merchants also entered this flourishing trade.

In the 17th and 18th centuries, the marble quarries were monitored by the Cybo and Malaspina families who ruled over the Duchy of Massa and Carrara. The family created the "Office of Marble" in 1564 to regulate the marble mining industry. The city of Massa, in particular, saw much of its plan redesigned (new roads, plazas, intersections, pavings) in order to make it worthy of an Italian country's capital. Following the extinction of the Cybo-Malaspina family, the state was ruled by the House of Austria-Este and management of the mines rested with them. Massa Cathedral is built entirely of Carrara marble and the old Ducal Palace of Massa was used to showcase the stone.

By the end of the 19th century, Carrara had become a cradle of anarchism in Italy, in particular among the quarry workers. According to a New York Times article of 1894, workers in the marble quarries were among the most neglected labourers in Italy. Many of them were ex-convicts or fugitives from justice. The work at the quarries was so tough and arduous that almost any aspirant worker with sufficient muscle and endurance was employed, regardless of their background.

The quarry workers and stone carvers had radical beliefs that set them apart from others. Anarchism and general radicalism became part of the heritage of the stone carvers. Many violent revolutionists who had been expelled from Belgium and Switzerland went to Carrara in 1885 and founded the first anarchist group in Italy. In Carrara, the anarchist Galileo Palla remarked, "even the stones are anarchists". The quarry workers were the main actors of the Lunigiana revolt in January 1894.

== Quarries ==
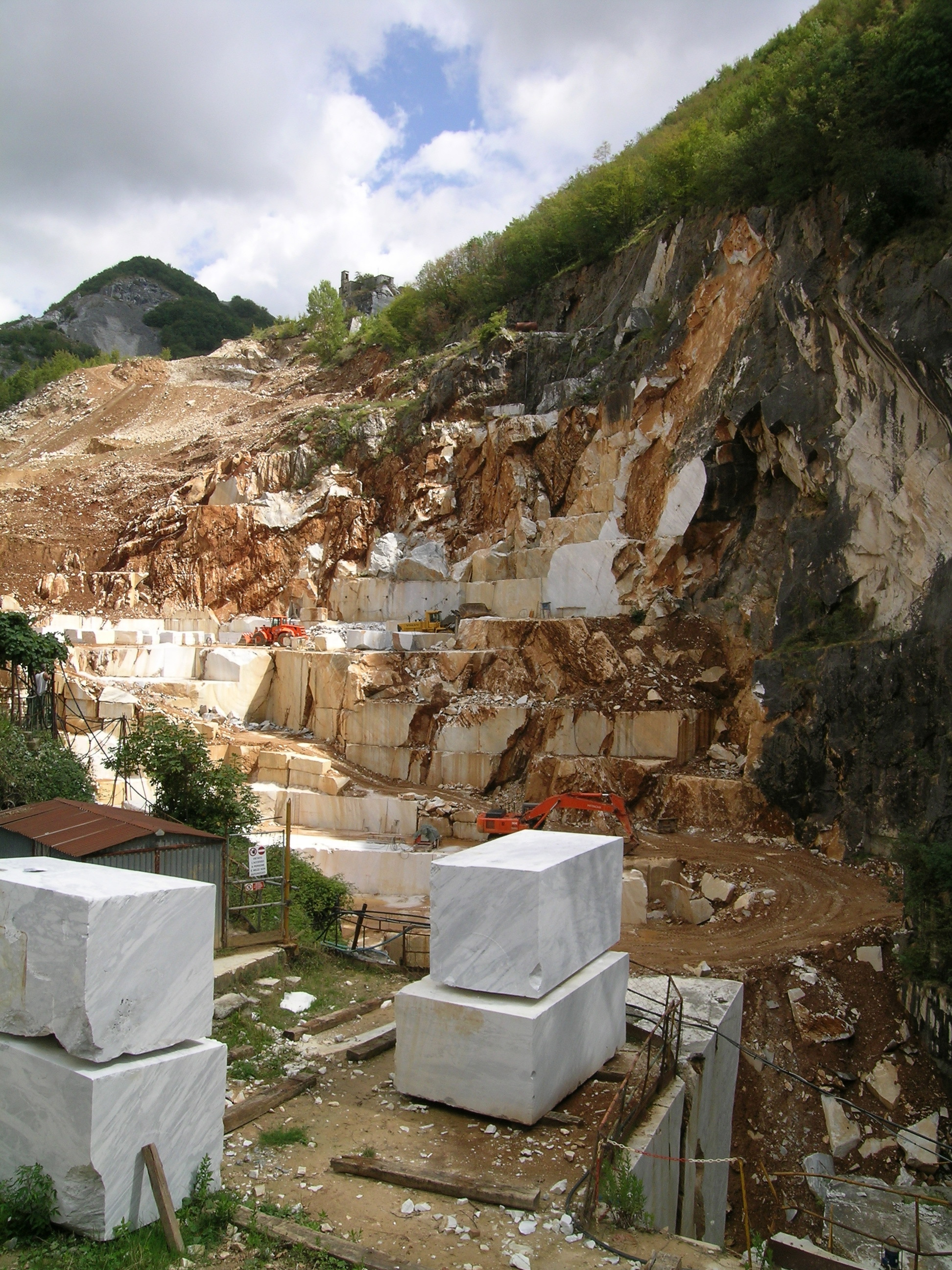
A Carrara marble quarry

The Apuan Alps above Carrara show evidence of at least 650 quarry sites, with about half of them currently abandoned or worked out. The Carrara quarries have produced more marble than any other place on earth.

Working the quarries is and has always been dangerous. In September 1911, a collapsing cliff face at the Bettogli Quarry crushed 10 workers who were on lunch break under a precipice. A 2014 video made at a Carrara quarry shows workers with missing fingers, and workers performing hazardous, painfully noisy work who are not wearing protective gear of any kind.

The prize yield from Carrara quarries through millennia has been statuario, a pure white marble (colour in other marbles arises from intermixture with other minerals present in the limestone as it is converted to marble by heat or pressure). The quarries also remove and ship marble streaked with black or grey.

Bianco Carrara classified in C and CD variations as well as Bianco Venatino and Statuarietto are by far the most common types with more expensive exotic variations such as Calacatta Gold, Calacatta Borghini, Calacatta Macchia Vecchia, Arabescato Cervaiole and Arabescato Vagli quarried throughout the Carrara area. Bardiglio has more black, and has been used since Roman times for architectural facings and floors.

== Notable monuments and buildings ==
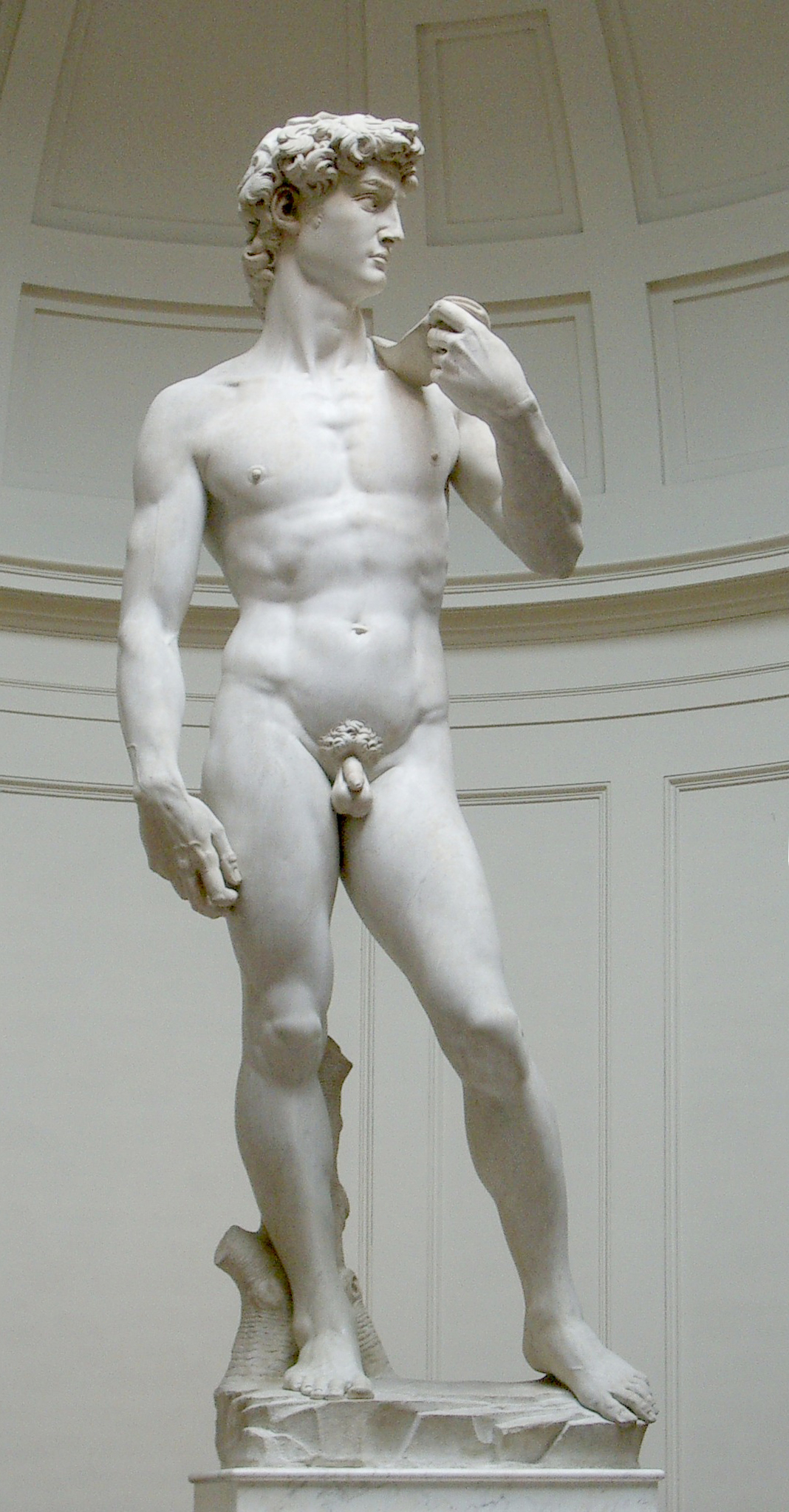
David, by Michelangelo, Galleria dell'Accademia, Florence

The marble from Carrara was used for some of the most remarkable buildings in Ancient Rome:

- Temple of Proserpina – later reused in many buildings in Valletta
- The Pantheon
- Trajan's Column
- Column of Marcus Aurelius

It was also used in many sculptures of the Renaissance including Michelangelo's David (1501–1504) whilst the statue to Robert Burns, which commands a central position in Dumfries, was carved in Carrara by Italian craftsmen working to Amelia Robertson Hill's model. It was unveiled by future UK Prime Minister Archibald Primrose, 5th Earl of Rosebery on 6 April 1882. Other notable occurrences include:

- Marble Arch, London, UK
- Victoria Memorial, London, UK
- Some sections of the Palace of the Marqués de Dos Aguas, Valencia, Spain
- Prem Mandir, Vrindavan, Uttar Pradesh, India
- Duomo di Siena, Siena, Italy
- Sarcophagus of St. Hedwig, Queen of Poland, Kraków, Poland
- Manila Cathedral (interior), Manila, Philippines
- First Canadian Place, Toronto, Ontario, Canada
- Sheikh Zayed Grand Mosque, Abu Dhabi, United Arab Emirates
- Harvard Medical School buildings, Boston, Massachusetts, US
- Oslo Opera House, Oslo, Norway
- Normandy American Cemetery and Memorial (Crosses and Stars of David), Normandy, France
- Peace Monument, Washington, D.C., US
- King Edward VII Memorial, Birmingham, UK
- Akshardham, Delhi, India
- Aon Center (Chicago) Chicago, Illinois, US
- Milwaukee Art Museum, Milwaukee, Wisconsin, US
- Banovina Palace, Novi Sad, Serbia
- Robba Fountain, Ljubljana, Slovenia
- Finlandia Hall, Helsinki, Finland (renovated with Lasa marble in 2024 due to chemical degradation)
- Devon Tower, Oklahoma City, Oklahoma, US
- The Rotunda (University of Virginia), Charlottesville, Virginia, US
- Far Eastern University, Manila, Philippines
- The Rome Italy Temple of the Church of Jesus Christ of Latter-day Saints
- Glasgow City Chambers, Glasgow, Scotland
- General Grant National Memorial (Tomb), New York, NY, US
- Winter Garden Atrium, World Financial Center, New York, NY, US
- Saadian Tombs, Marrakesh, Morocco
- Baháʼí World Centre buildings, Haifa, Israel
- Shrine of ʻAbdu’l‑Bahá, Akka, Israel

Carrara marble has been designated by the International Union of Geological Sciences as a Global Heritage Stone Resource.

== Use in isotopic standard ==
Calcite, obtained from an 80 kg sample of Carrara marble, is used as the IAEA-603 isotopic standard in mass spectrometry for the calibration of δ^{18}O and δ^{13}C.

== In popular culture ==
Carrara marble has been featured in various forms of media and entertainment. Notably, its location appears in the film The Brutalist, where the quarries provide a dramatic backdrop.

== Gallery ==
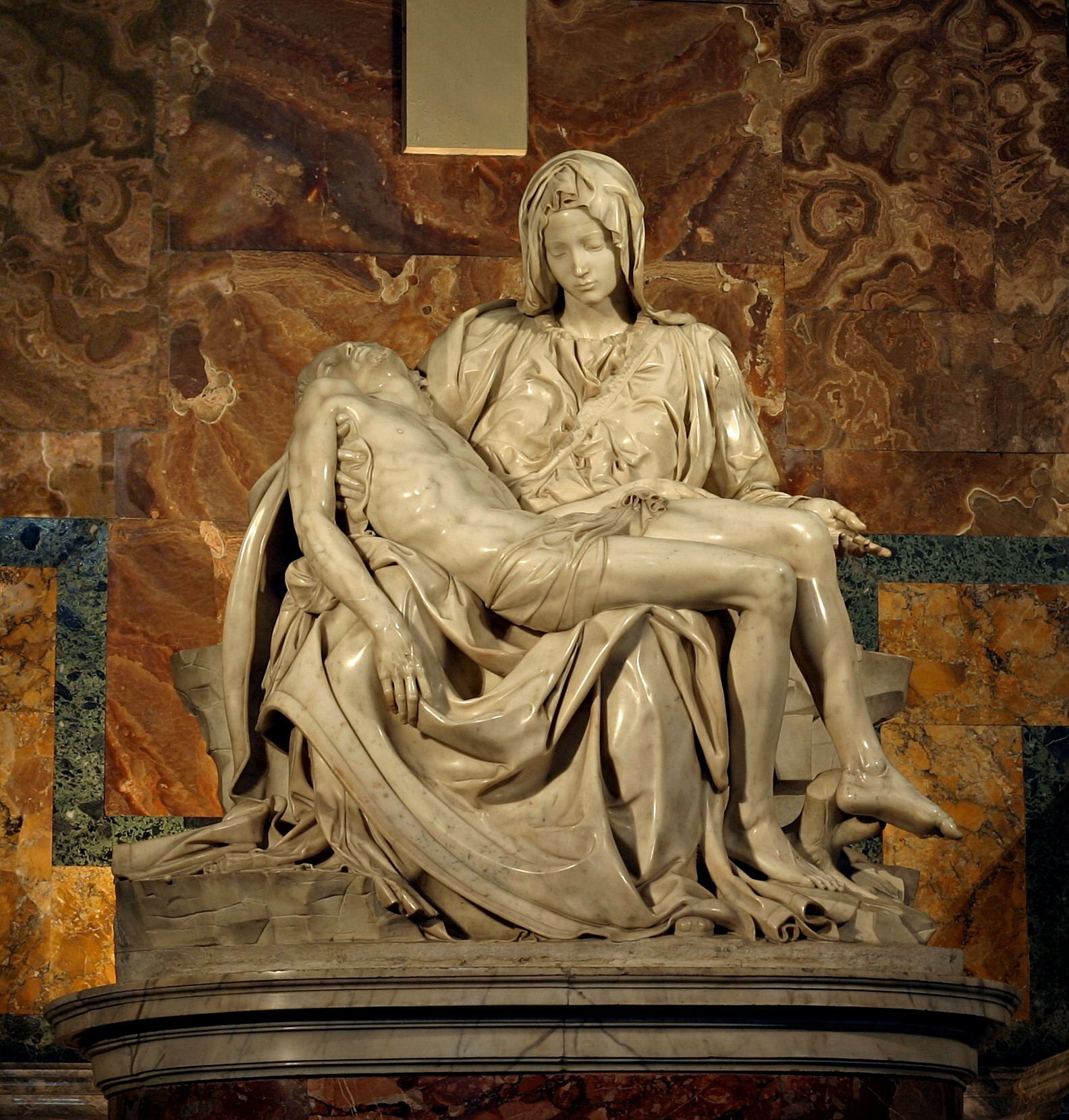
Michelangelo's Pietà, St. Peter's Basilica, Vatican City

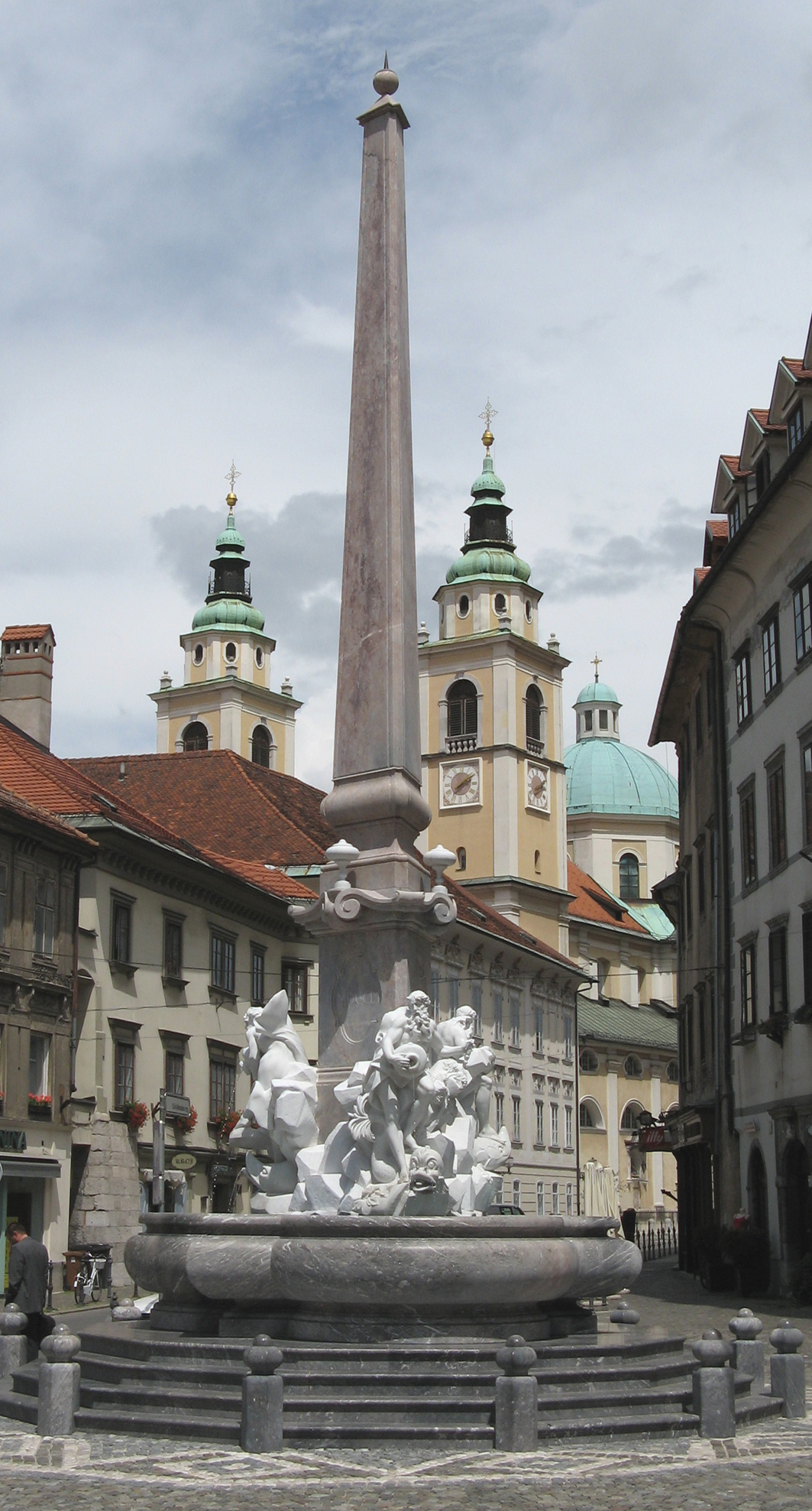
Replica of the Robba Fountain at Town Square, Ljubljana. The sculptural part of the fountain is made of Carrara marble, the obelisk of local Lesno Brdo limestone, and the pool of local Podpeč limestone.

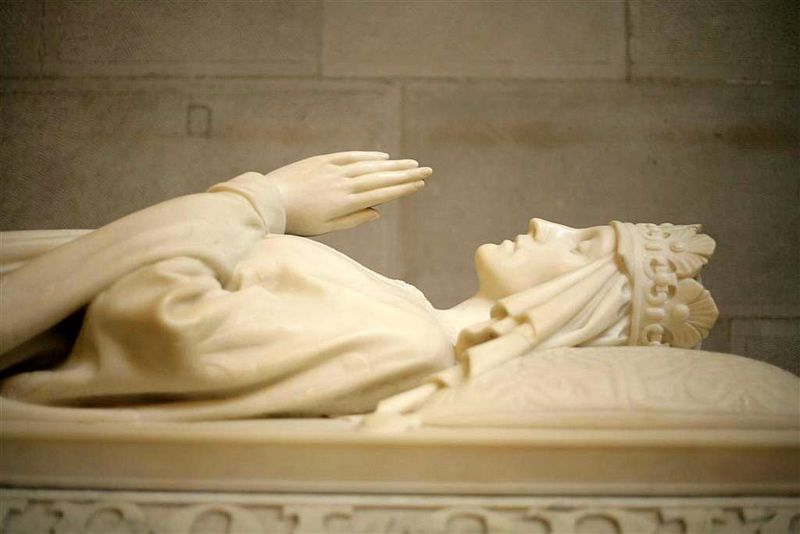
Jadwiga of Poland's sarcophagus by Antoni Madeyski in Wawel Cathedral, Kraków

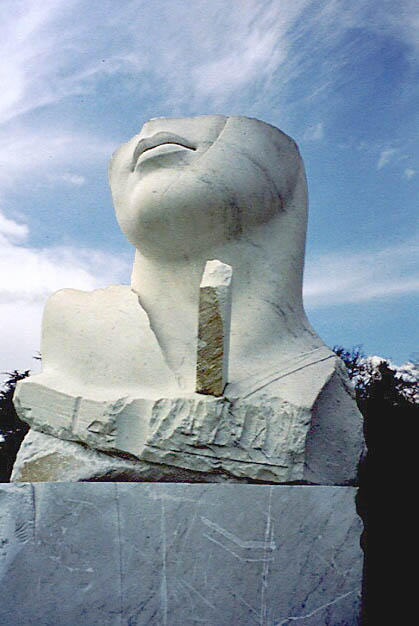
Héros de Lumiere, by Igor Mitoraj. As of 2004 displayed at the Yorkshire Sculpture Park.

Interior of the Main Prayer Hall in Sheikh Zayed Grand Mosque, Abu Dhabi, United Arab Emirates

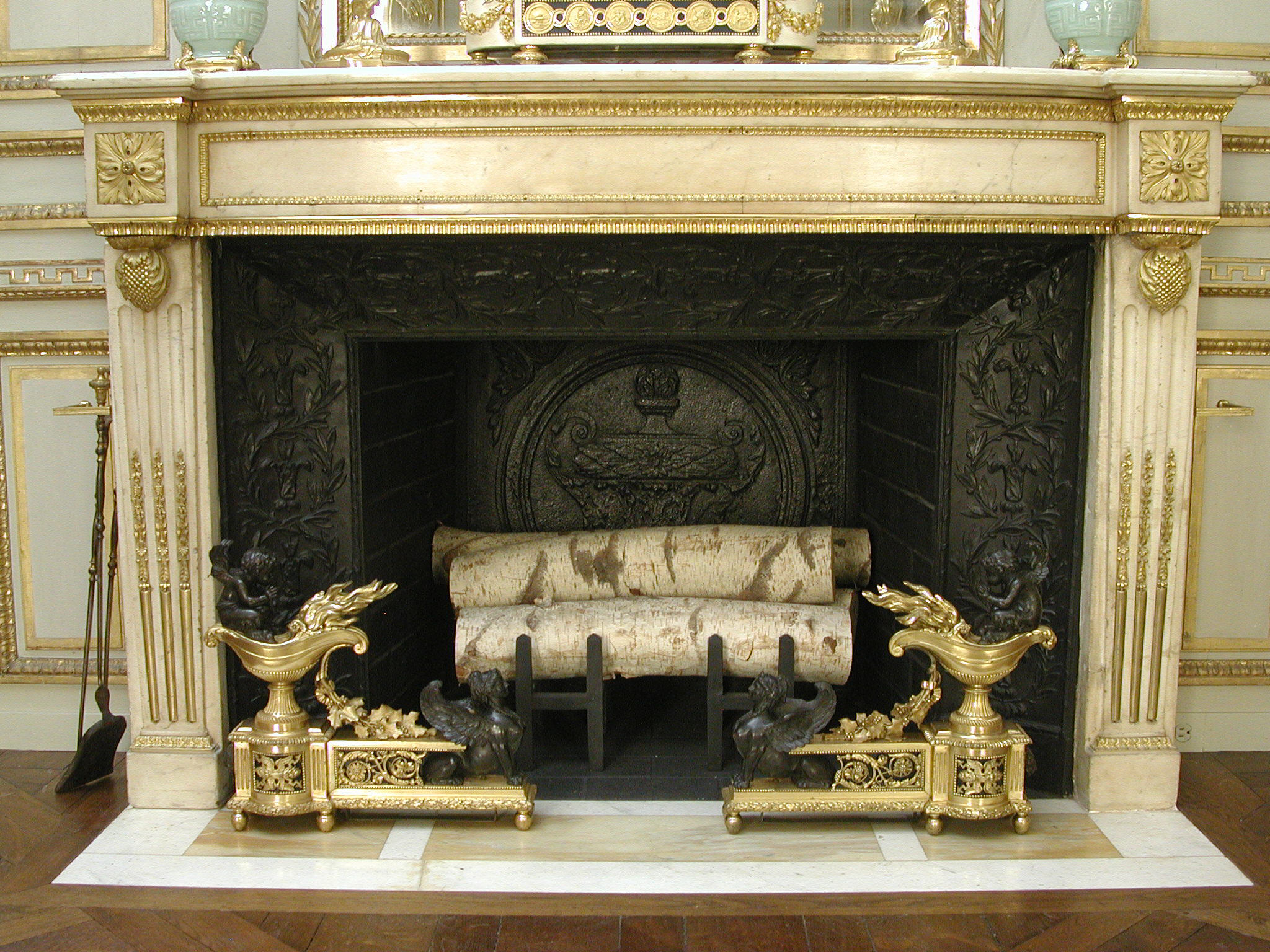
Parisian chimneypiece, c. 1775–1785, Carrara marble with gilt bronze, height: 111.4 cm, width: 169.5 cm, depth: 41.9 cm

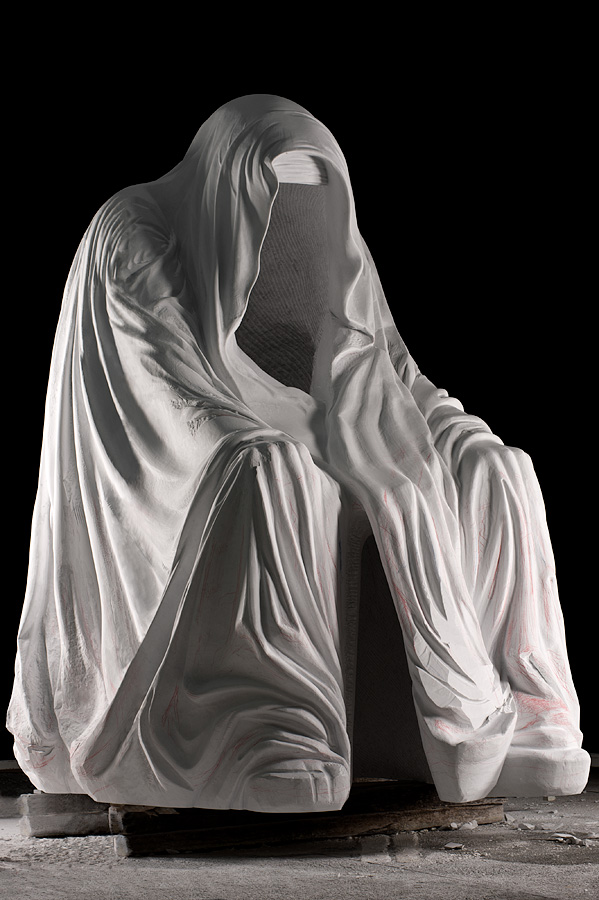
The Cloak of Conscience, Piétà or Commendatore, by Anna Chromý located in Cathedral in Salzburg, Austria, Stavovske divadlo in Prague, National Archaeological Museum in Athens and elsewhere

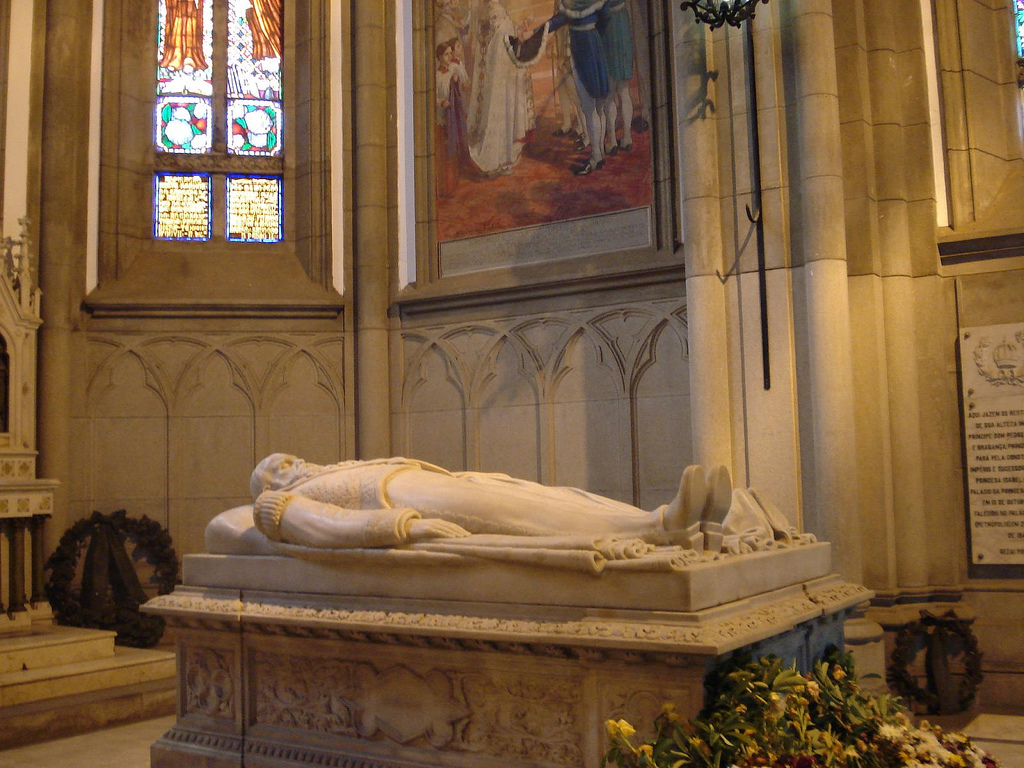
Tomb of Emperor Pedro II of Brazil and his wife Teresa Cristina, by Jean Magrou (gisant) and Hildegardo Leão Veloso (reliefs) in the Cathedral of Saint Peter of Alcantara in Petrópolis, Brazil

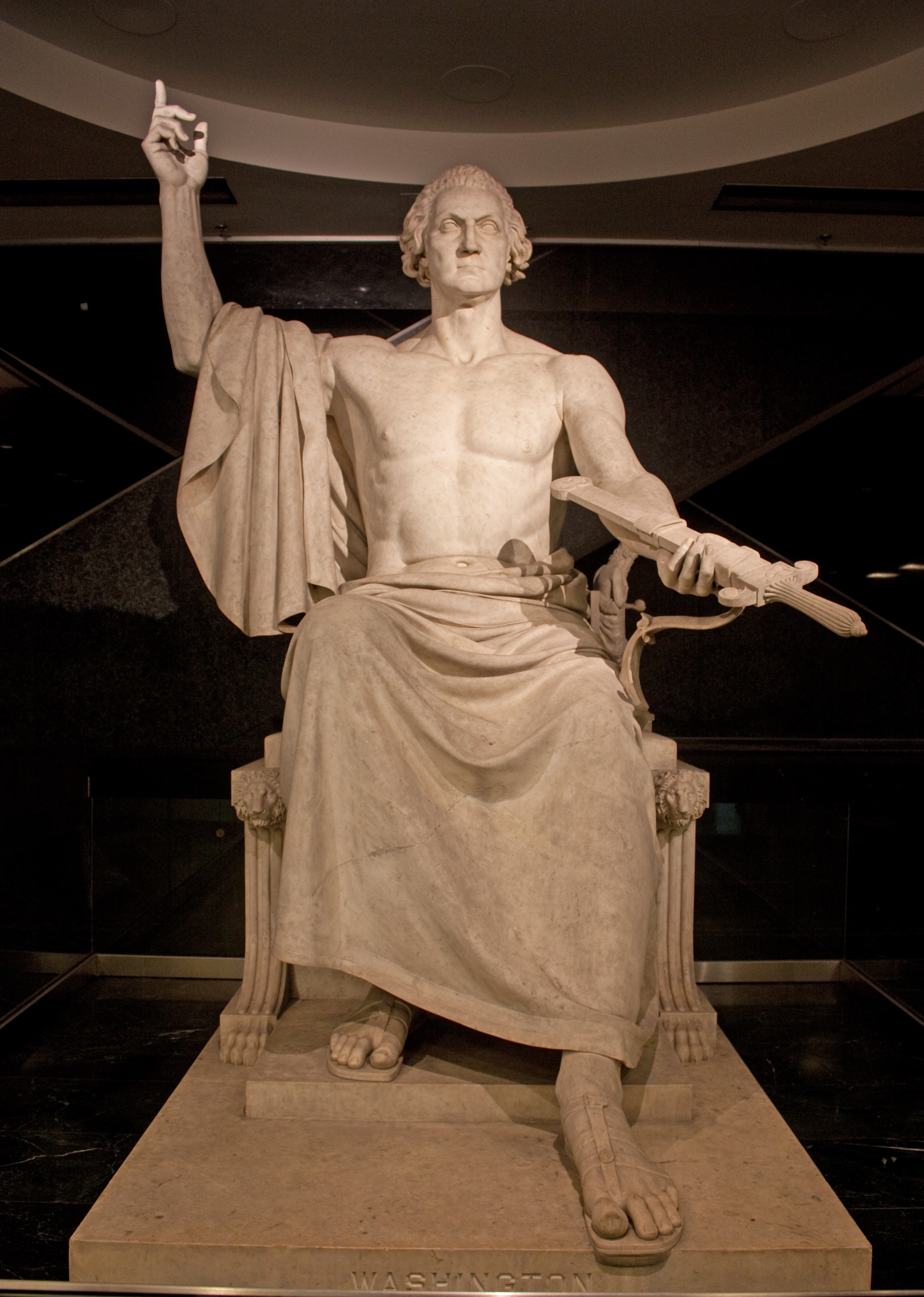
The George Washington statue on display at the National Museum of American History

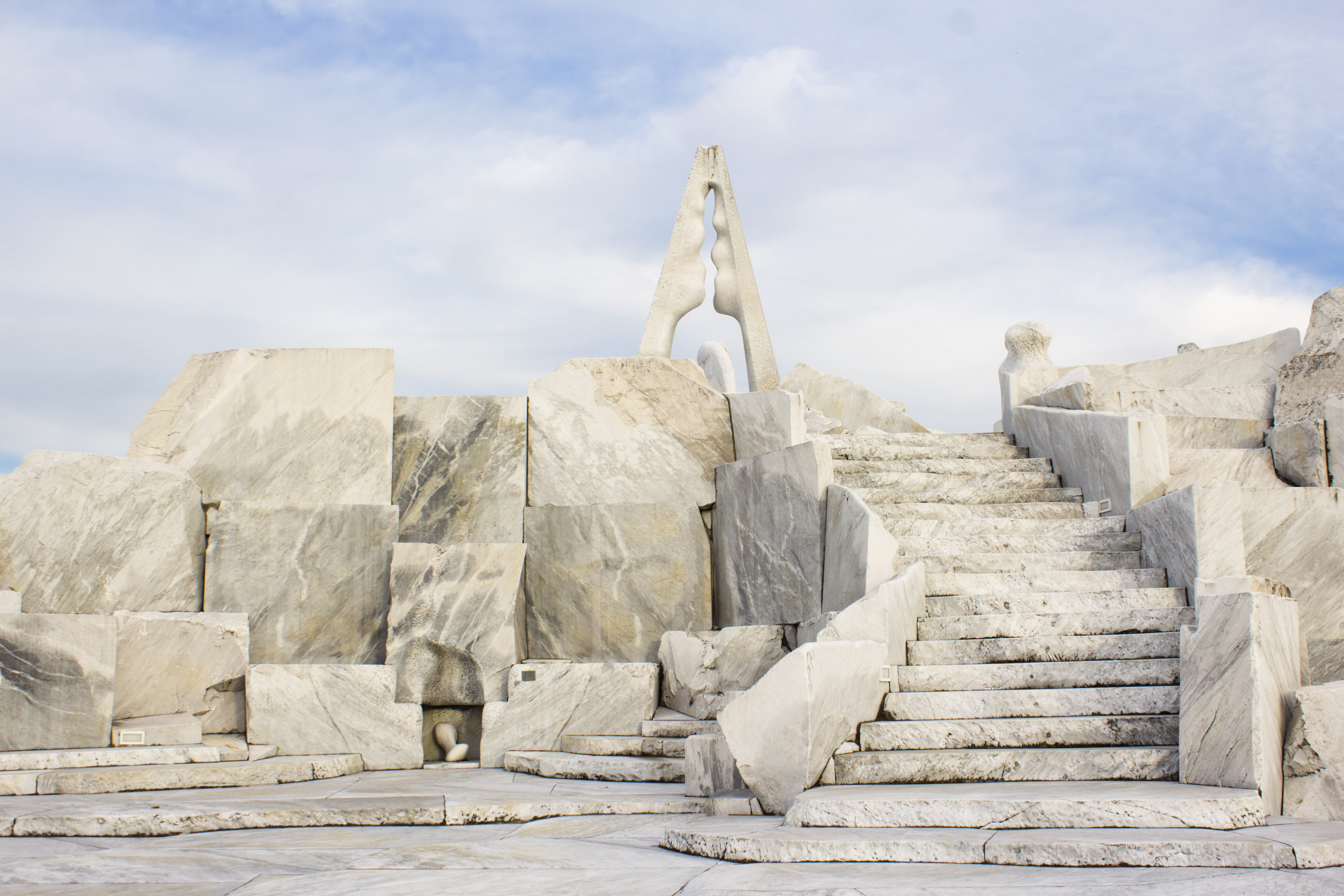
The Hill of Hope monument in Onomichi, Hiroshima, is landscaped with five thousand square metres of Carrara marble.

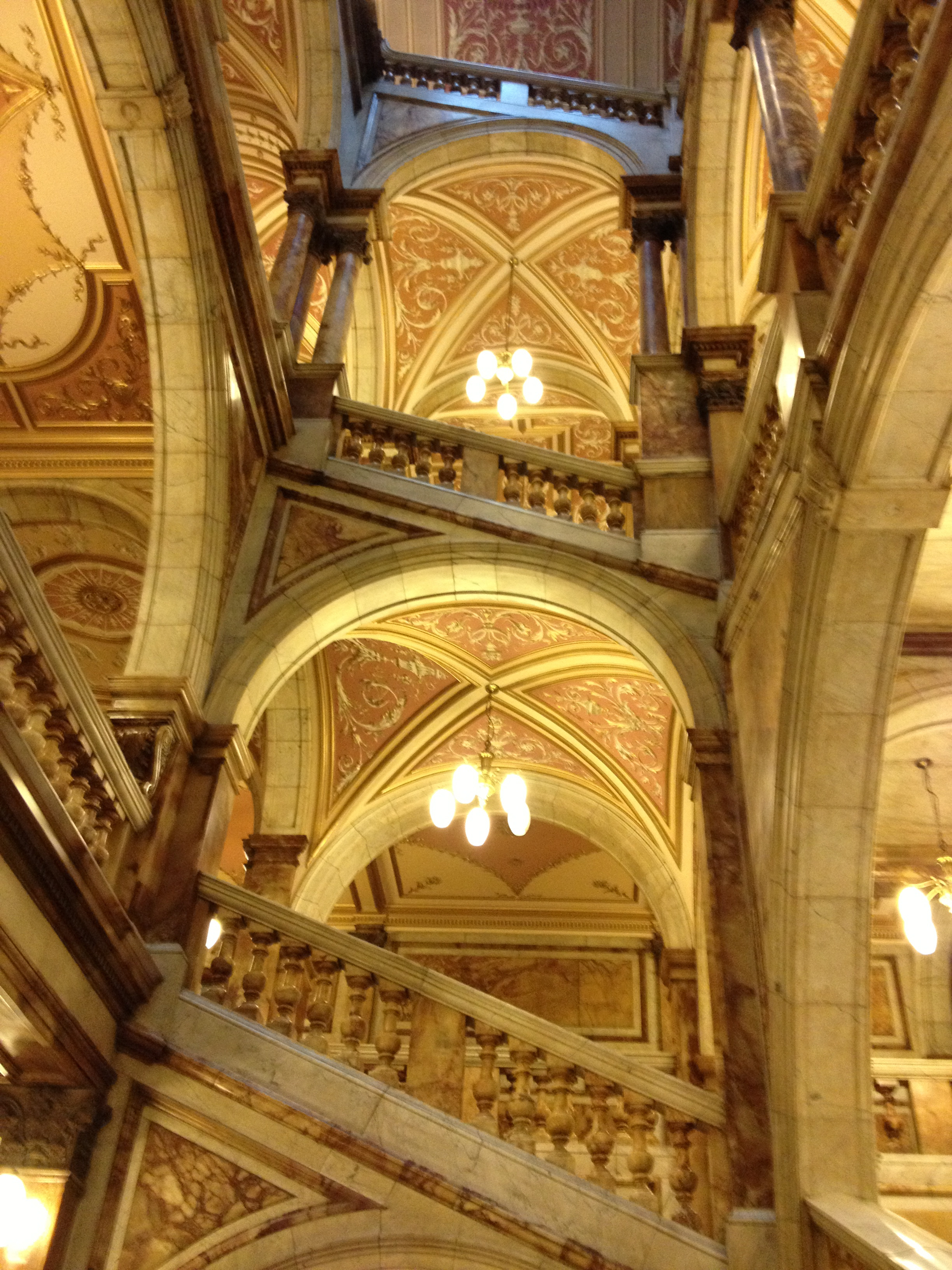
Staircase, Glasgow City Chambers

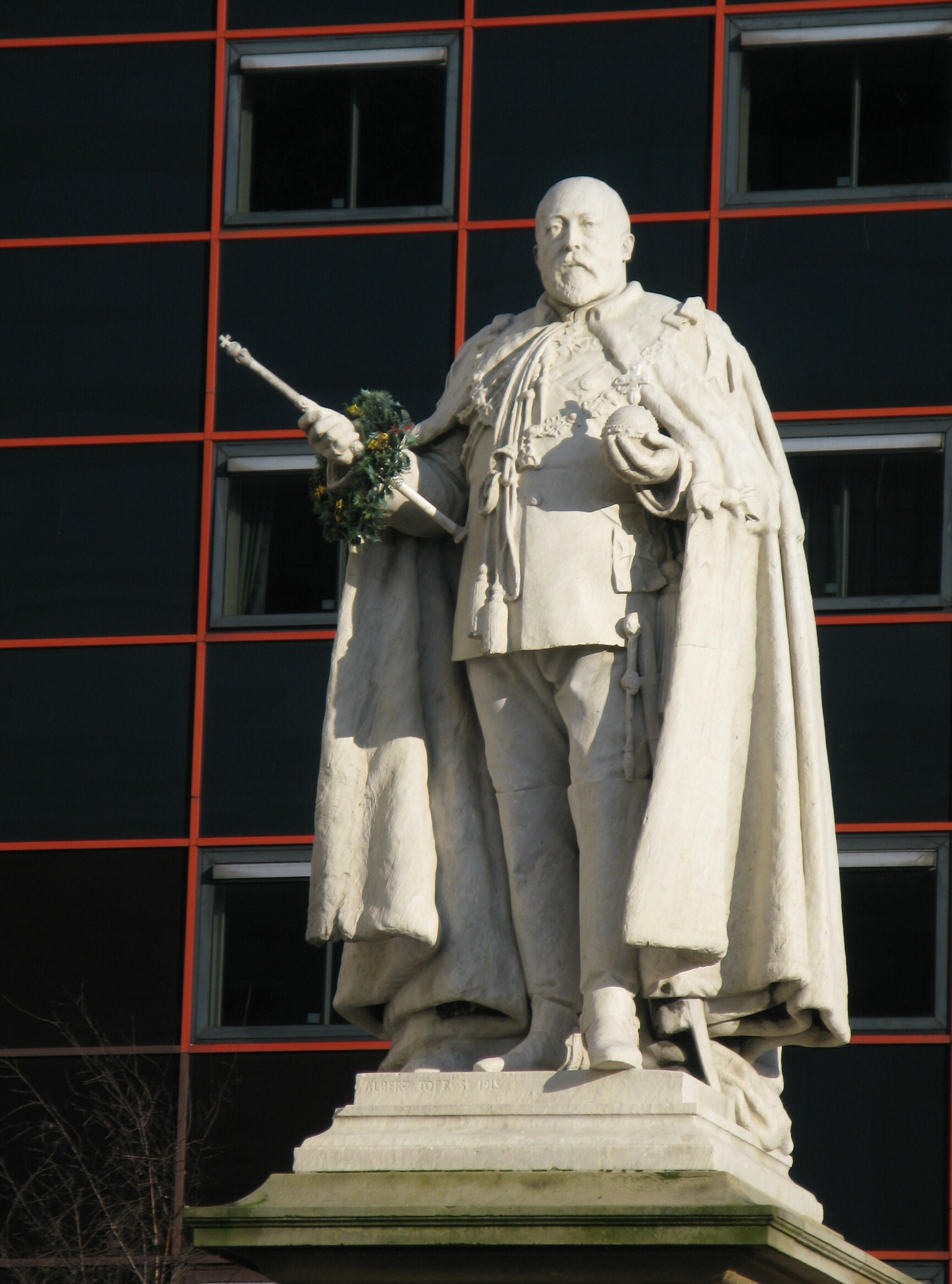
Birmingham's King Edward VII Memorial was carved from a large piece of Carrara marble.

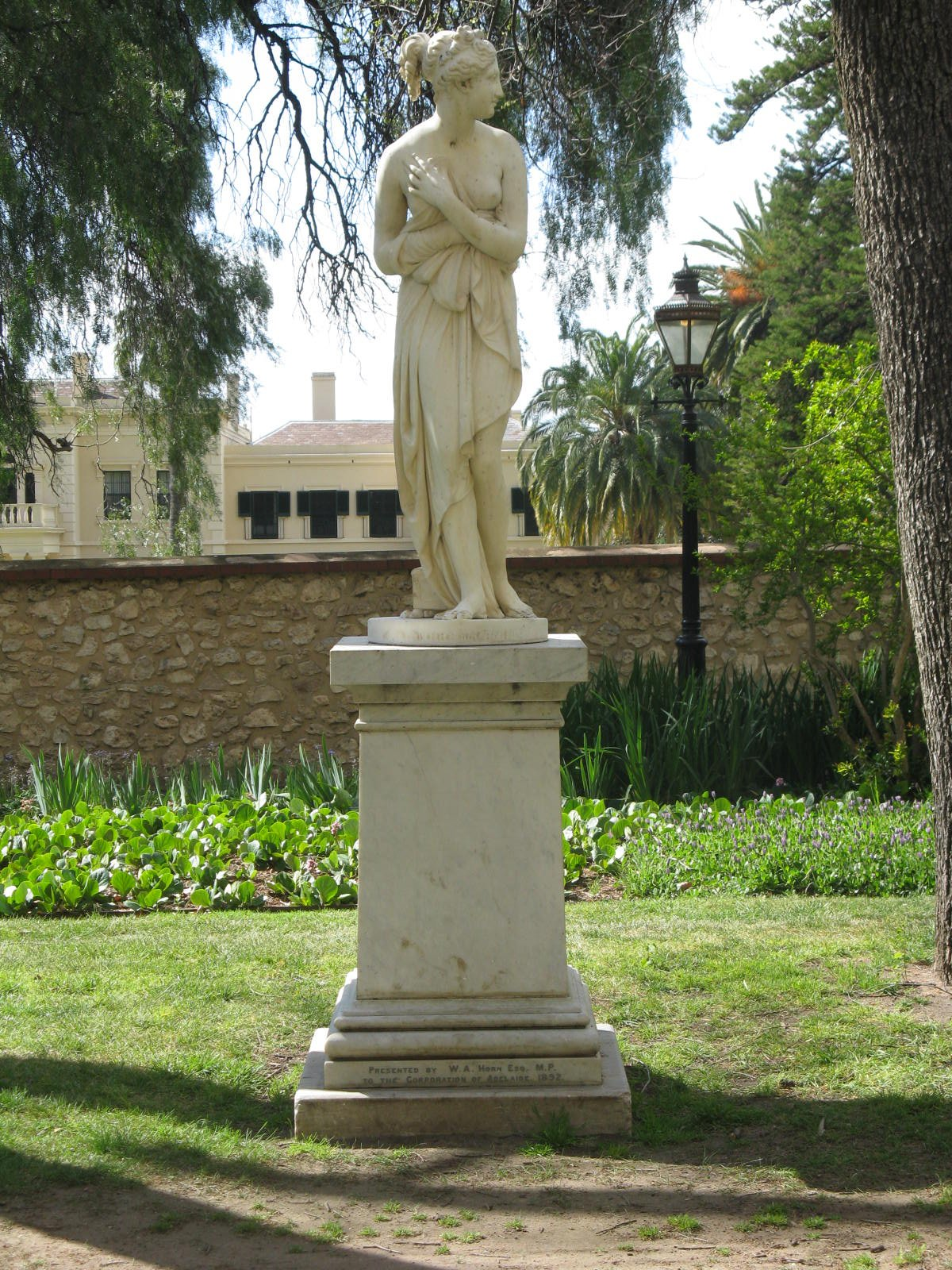
Adelaide's first street statue, Venere di Canova, a copy of Venus Italica, was carved from Carrara marble.

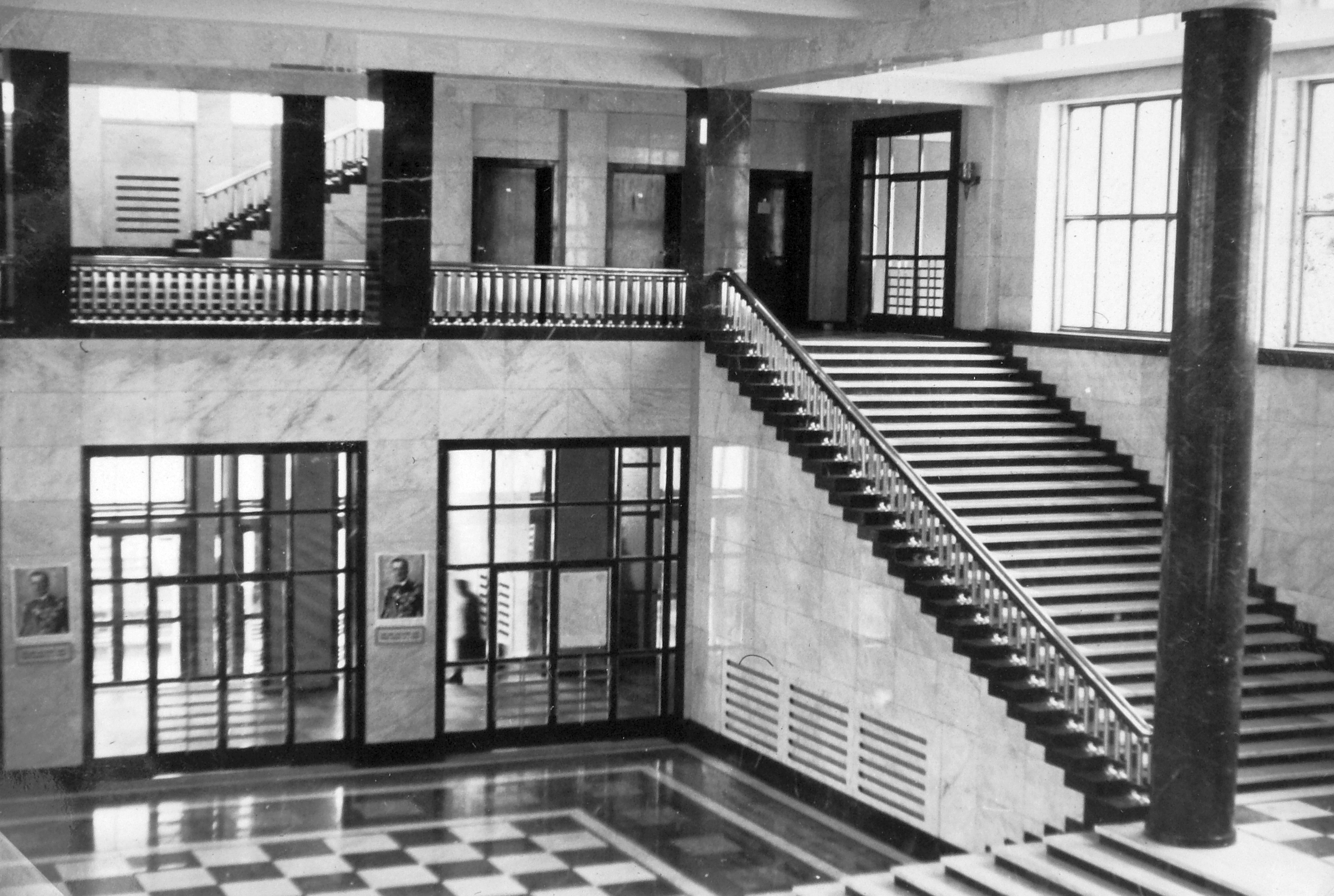
Banovina Palace, Novi Sad, Serbia. The interior is done in Carrara marble, while the exterior is done in Brač marble.

== Degradation ==
The black yeast Micrococcus halobius can colonize Carrara marble by forming a biofilm and producing gluconic, lactic, pyruvic and succinic acids from glucose, as seen in the Dionysos Theater of the Acropolis in Athens.

== See also ==
- No Cav
- List of types of marble
- Lizza di Piastreta
- Marmifera di Carrara railway
- Lardo, a culinary speciality of the Carrara region commonly cured in basins made of Carrara marble
