= Petersfriedhof Salzburg =

Burial site in Salzburg, Austria

Coordinates: 47°47′48″N 13°02′44″E

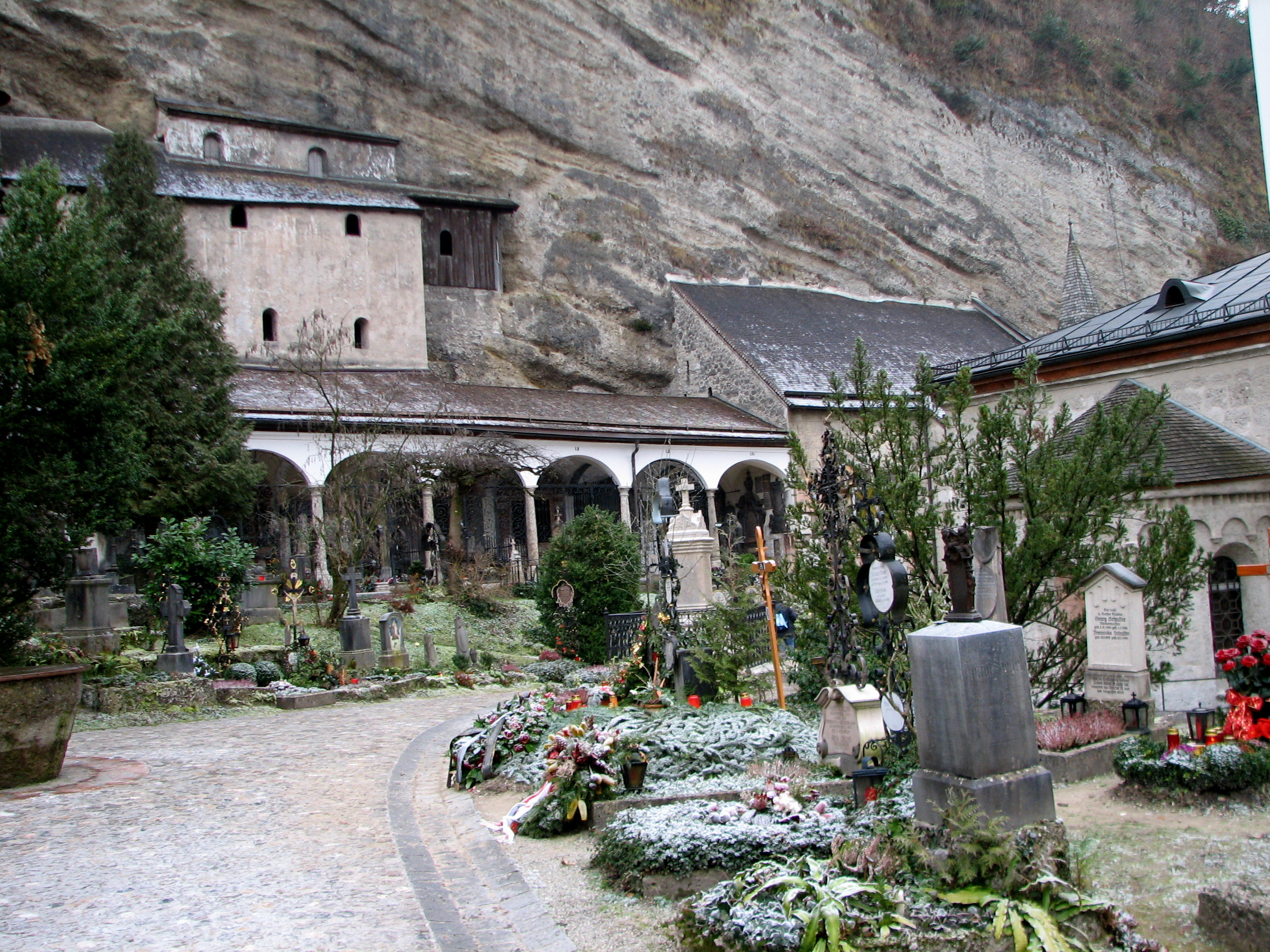
St. Peter's Cemetery with catacombs

The Petersfriedhof or St. Peter's Cemetery is – together with the burial site at Nonnberg Abbey – the oldest cemetery in the Austrian city of Salzburg, located at the foot of the Festungsberg with Hohensalzburg Castle. It is one of Salzburg's most popular tourist attractions.

Closed in 1878, the site decayed until in 1930 the monks of St. Peter's successfully urged for the admission of new burials.

== History ==
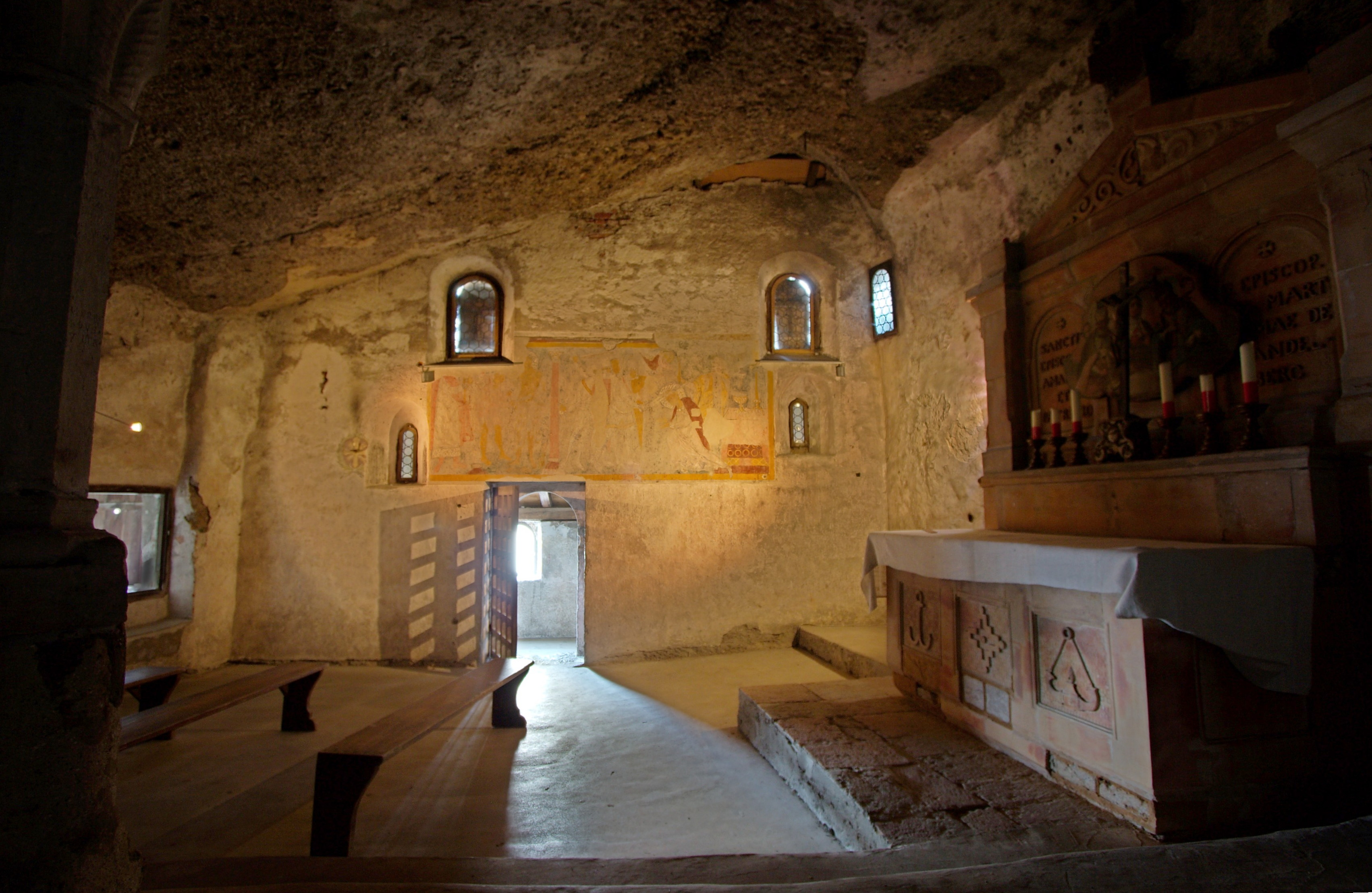
Catacomb chapel

Its origins date back to about 700, when the adjacent St. Peter's Abbey (Stift St. Peter) was established by Saint Rupert of Salzburg. The abbey's cemetery, probably at the site of an even earlier burial place, was first mentioned in an 1139 deed, the oldest tombstone dates to 1288.

=== Catacombs ===
Carved into the rock of the Festungsberg are catacombs that may stem from the Early Christian days of Severinus of Noricum during the Migration Period. They include two chapels: The Maximuskapelle and the Gertraudenkapelle, consecrated in 1178 under the Salzburg Archbishop Conrad of Wittelsbach and dedicated to the assassinated Archbishop Thomas Becket of Canterbury.

A second chapel, The Margarethenkapelle (Margaret Chapel), rebuilt in 1491, occupies a site in the center of the cemetery.

== Notable burials ==
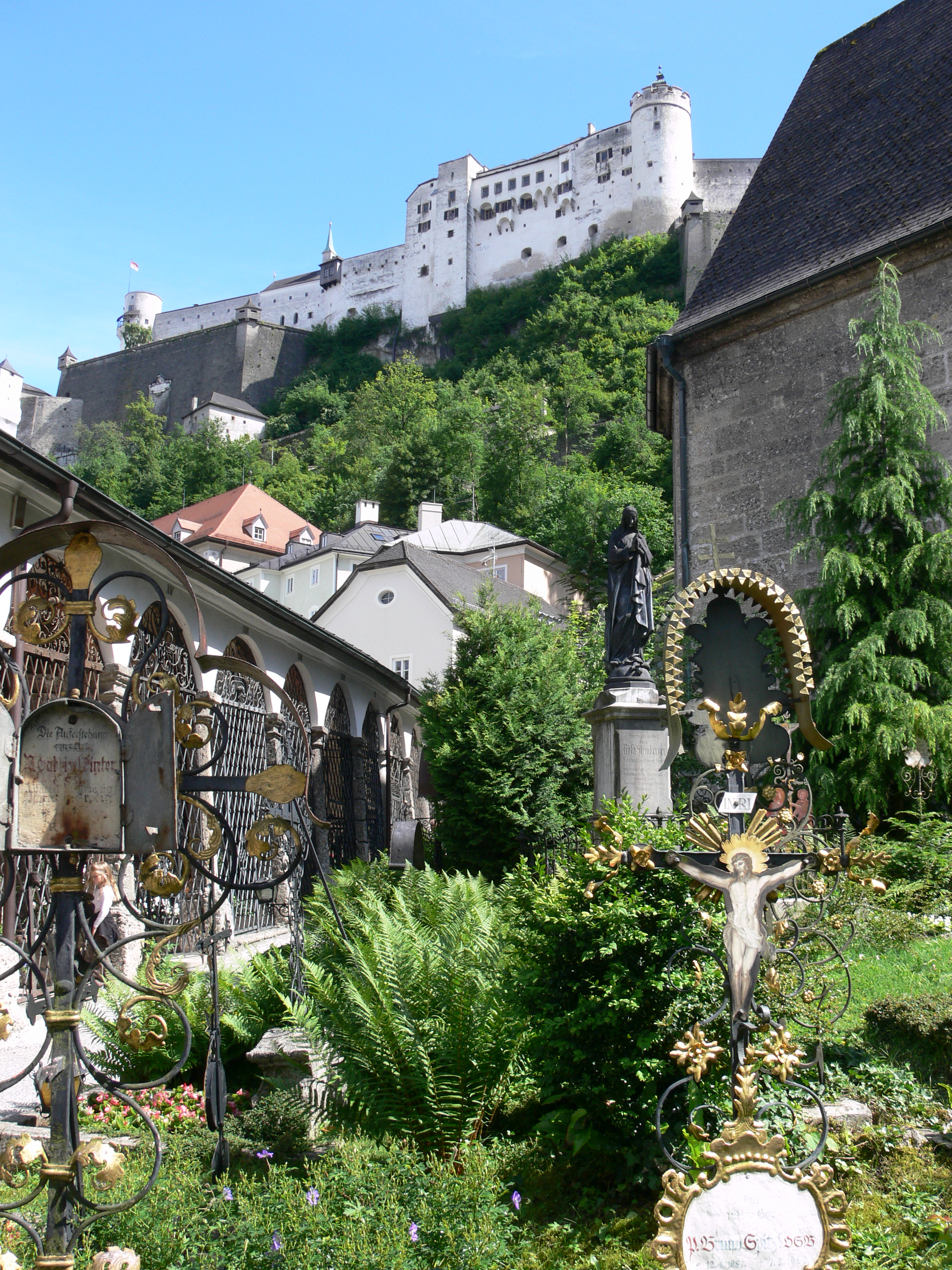
View to Hohensalzburg Castle

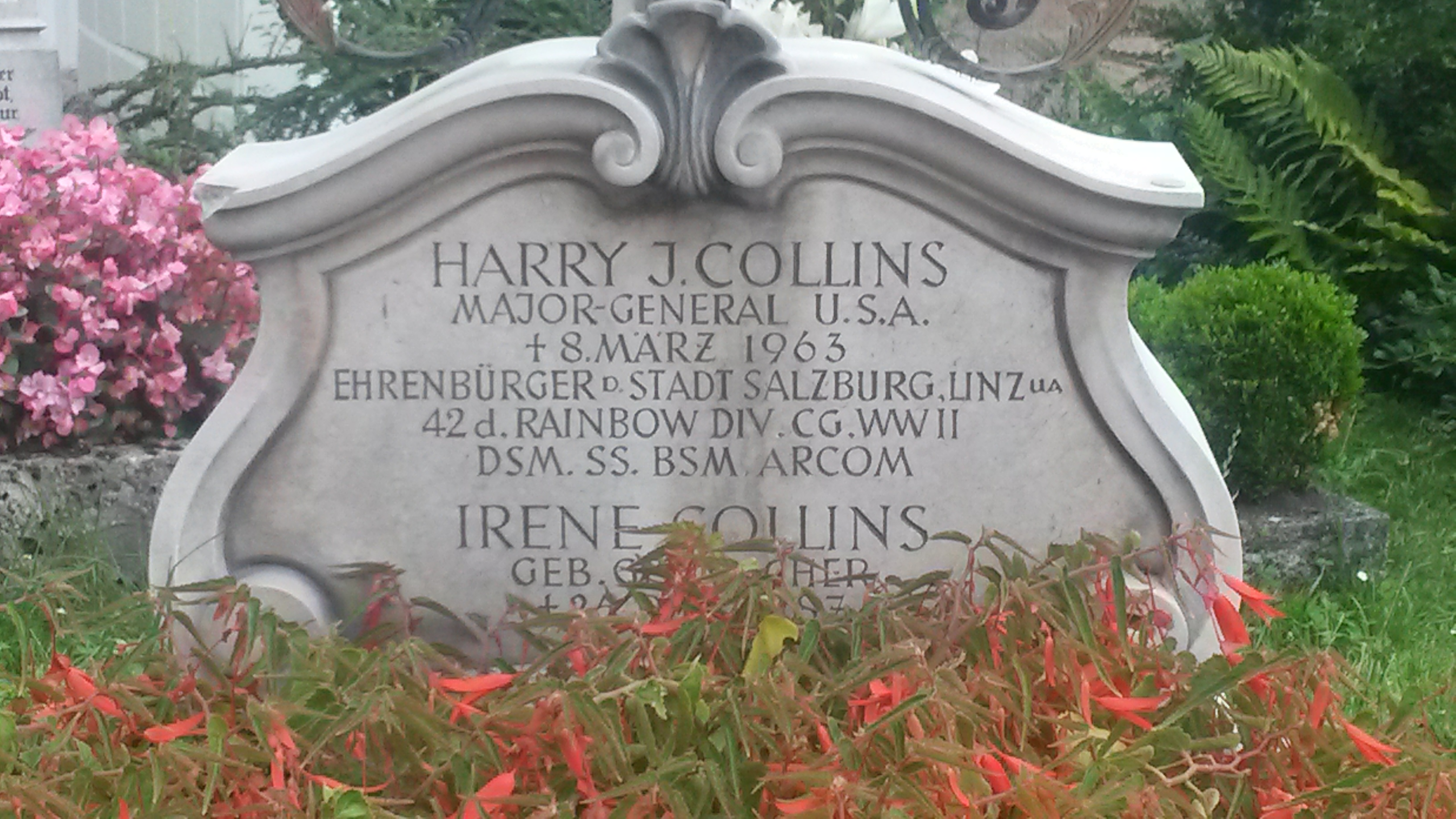
Gravestone of General Harry J. Collins in Salzburg

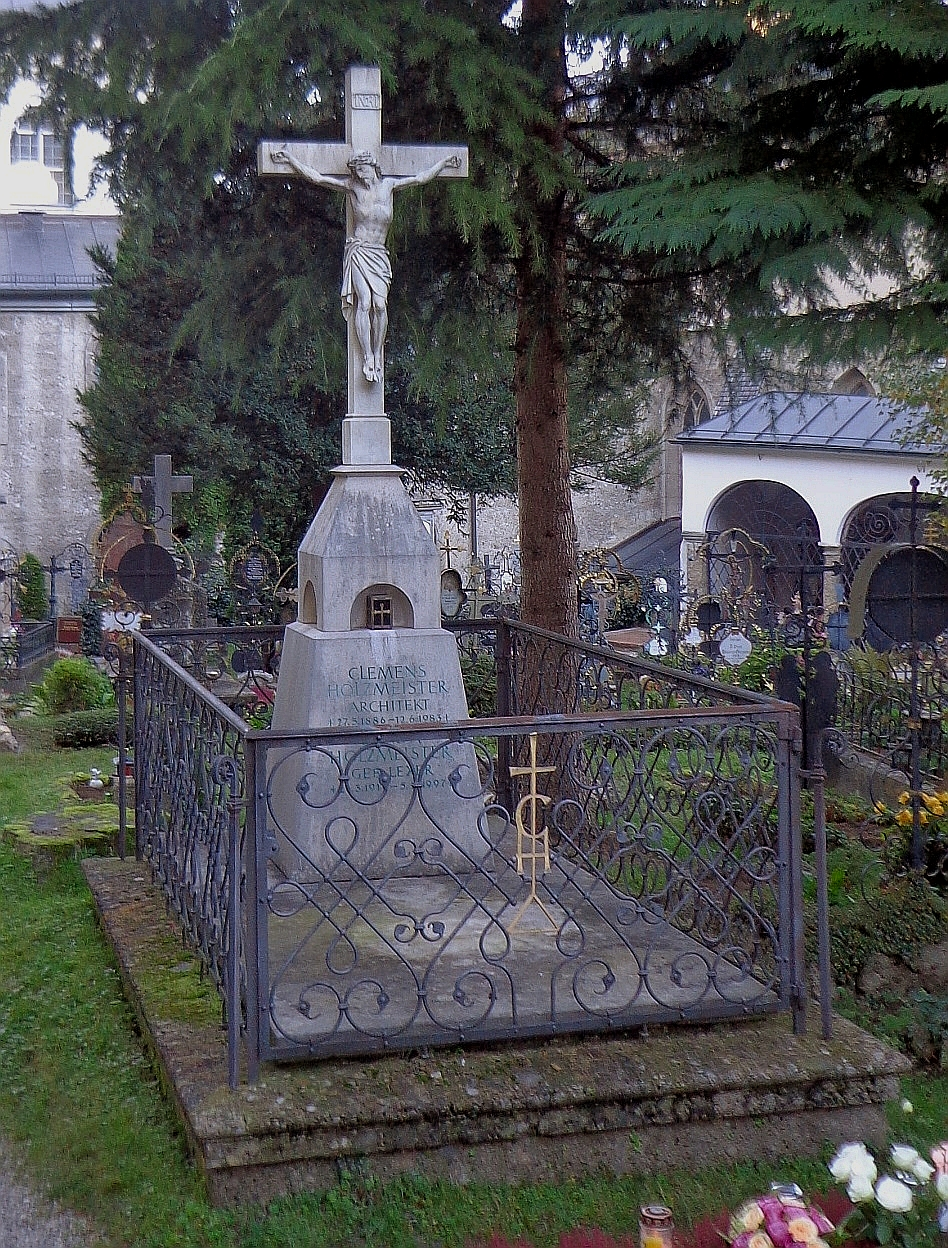
Grave of Clemens Holzmeister

- Santino Solari, architect (1646)
- Heinrich Ignaz Franz Biber, composer (1704)
- de:Johann Christian Paurnfeind, Salzburg mayor (1768)
- Sigmund Haffner, Salzburg mayor (1772)
- de:Ignatz Anton von Weiser, Mozart librettist (1785)
- de:Wolfgang Hagenauer, architect (1801)
- Michael Haydn, composer, younger brother of Joseph Haydn (1806)
- Maria Anna Mozart (Nannerl), elder sister of Wolfgang Amadeus Mozart (1829)
- de:Johann Georg von Hagenauer, architect, younger brother of Wolfgang Hagenauer, (1835)
- de:Heinrich Ritter von Mertens, Salzburg mayor (1872)
- Georg Pezolt, painter (1878)
- Richard Mayr, opera singer (1935)
- Carl Mayr, artist, elder brother of Richard Mayr (1942)
- de:Otto Pflanzl, poet (1943)
- Franz Martin, historian (1950)
- de:Richard Hildmann, Salzburg mayor (1952)
- Harry J. Collins (1963), US Army Major General
- Bernhard Paumgartner, conductor (1971)
- de:Gustav Kapsreiter, maecenas (1971)
- Leopoldine Wojtek, artist (1978)
- Clemens Holzmeister, architect (1983)
- Franz Wasner, priest, musician, spiritual adviser and musical director of the Von Trapp family (1992)
- Hans Lechner, politician (1994)
- de:Georg Schuchter, actor (2001)
- Anna Chromy, sculptor and painter (2021)

== See also ==
- Salzburgerland
