= Santino Solari =

Italian sculptor

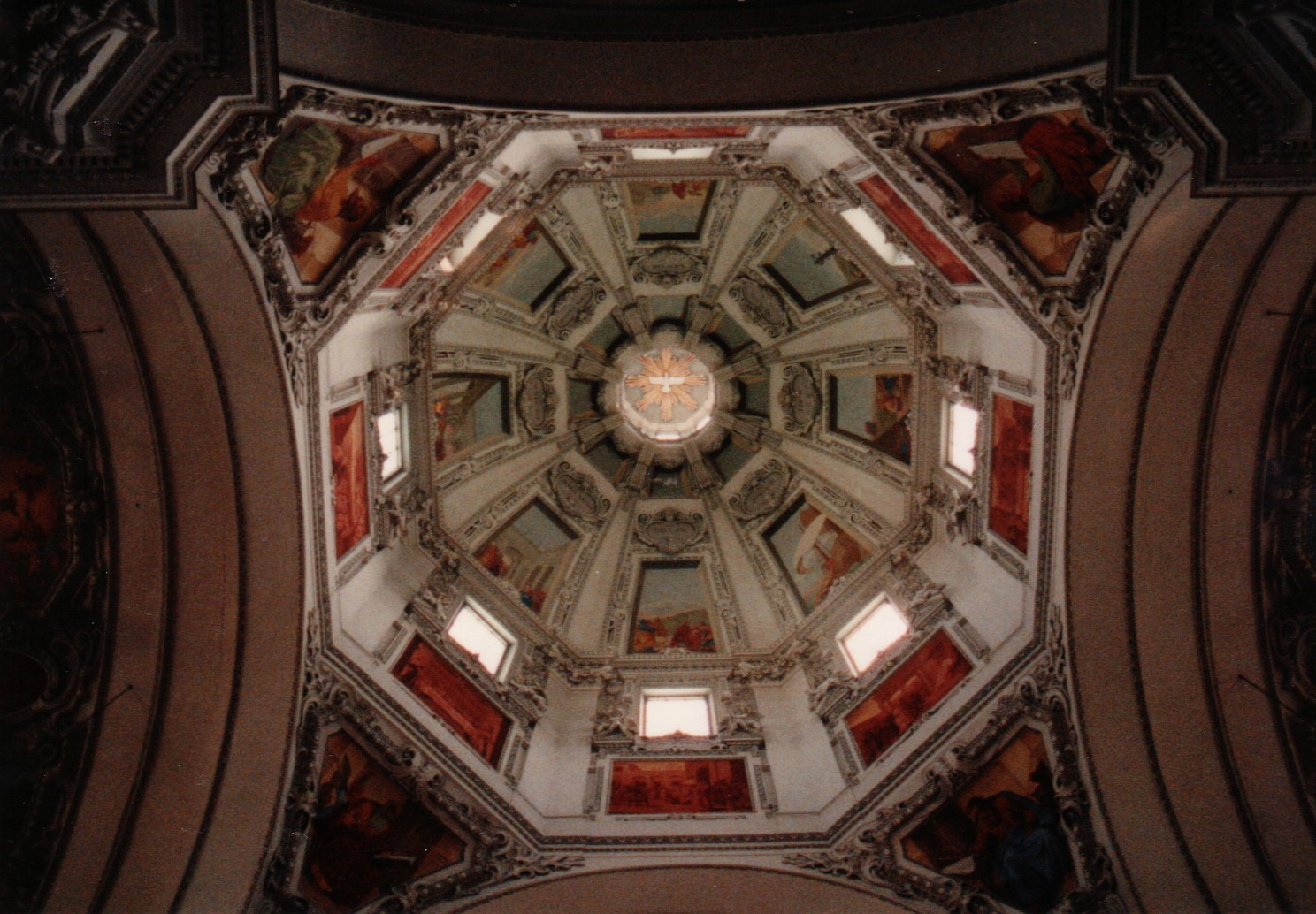
Interior of the octagonal dome of Salzburg Cathedral, designed by Solari

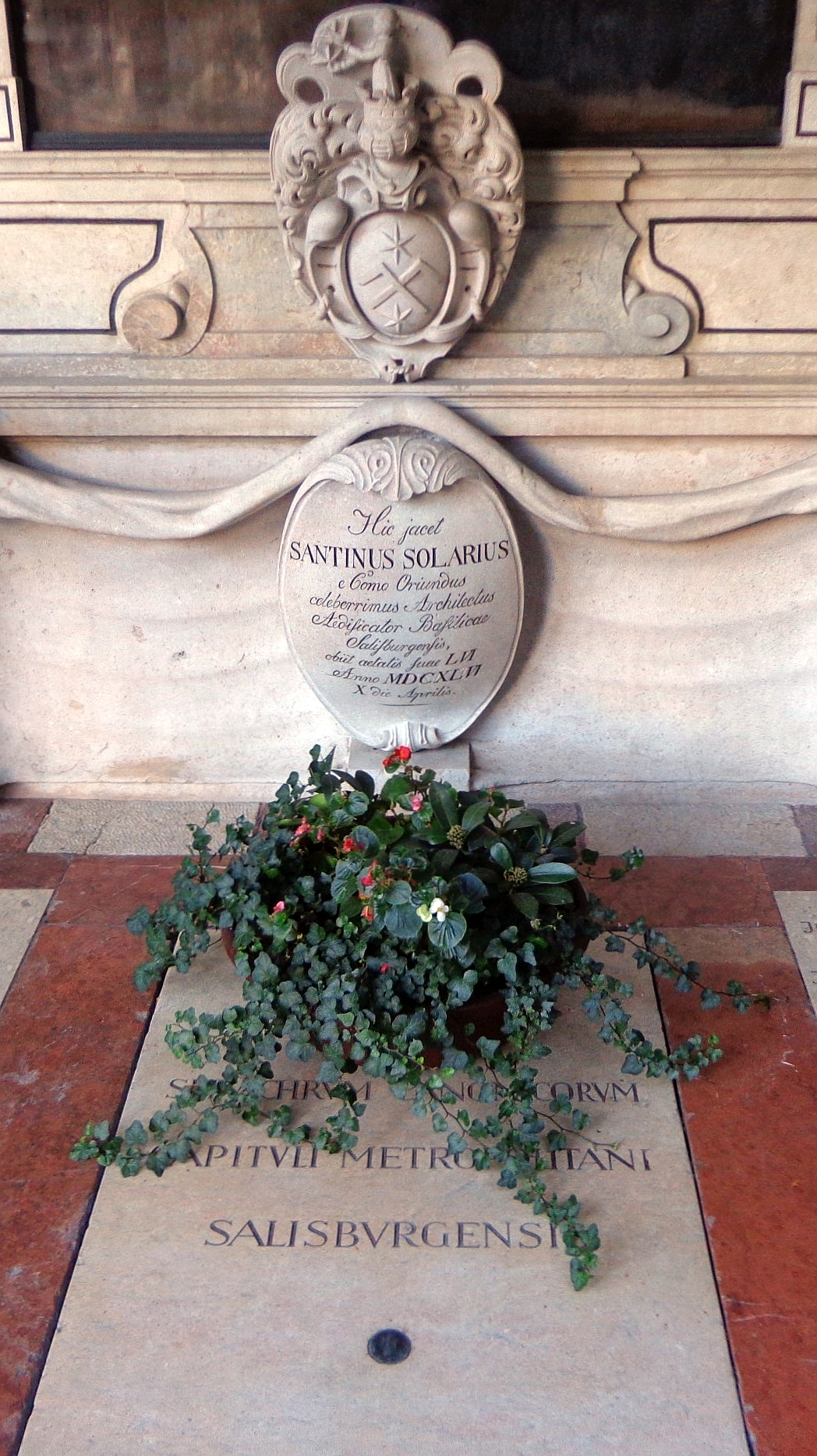
Crypt 31 (Petersfriedhof Salzburg): the grave of Santino Solari

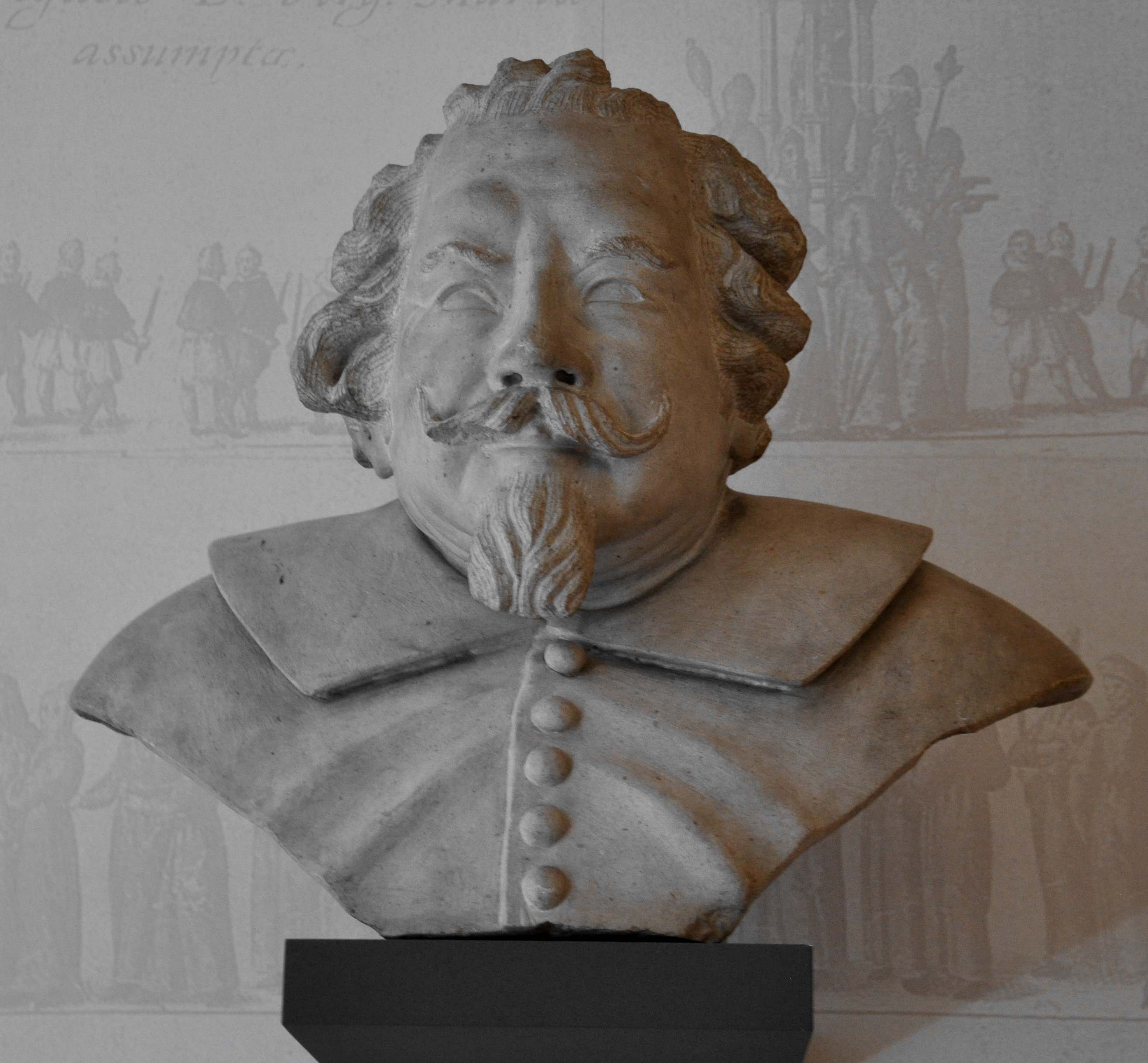
Bust of Santino Solari

Santino Solari (1576 – April 10, 1646), was a Swiss architect and sculptor, who worked mainly in Austria. He was born in the Canton of Tessin, in Switzerland, near Lugano.

In 1612, he was appointed chief architect of Salzburg by the archbishop Markus Sittikus. His work introduced Lombard early baroque to Austria. Solari died in Salzburg and is buried in the Petersfriedhof Salzburg there.

== Works ==
- Fortifications in the city and province of Salzburg (e.g., in Neumarkt am Wallersee)
- Schloss Hellbrunn with its trick fountains
- Salzburg cathedral after having modified the plans by Vincenzo Scamozzi

His son, Ignazio Solari, executed, together with Fra Donato Mascagni, the frescoes in the Salzburg Cathedral. He also painted the altar piece "Burial of Christ" on the north wall of the cathedral.
