= Cloak of Conscience =

Sculpture by Anna Chromý

- Artist: Anna Chromý
- Year: 2006–2011
- Type: Carrara marble
- Dimensions: 430 cm × 280 cm × 380 cm (170 in × 110 in × 150 in)

The Cloak of Conscience and Tolerance is a sculpture by Anna Chromý carved from a single block of white marble excavated from the Michelangelo Quarry in Carrara, Italy, where Michelangelo sourced the marble for his iconic David. Anna Chromy's creation represents her largest work of art since Chromy turned to sculpture from surrealist oil paintings in 1992. As a result of her work on Cloak, Chromy was the first woman to be awarded the Premio Michelangelo, the annual award for sculpture, in 2008.

== Dimensions ==
From the original 250 tonnes (280 short tons) block, the final sculpture of the Cloak weighs 45 t (50 short tons) and features a hollow space in the centre large enough to accommodate two adults standing. The entrance is at the front where one fold of the cloak overlaps the other. The Cloak is 470 centimetres (15.4 ft) high on its plinth. By comparison, David is 517 centimetres (16.96 ft) and the height of an average adult male is 180 centimetres (5.9 ft).

== History and versions ==
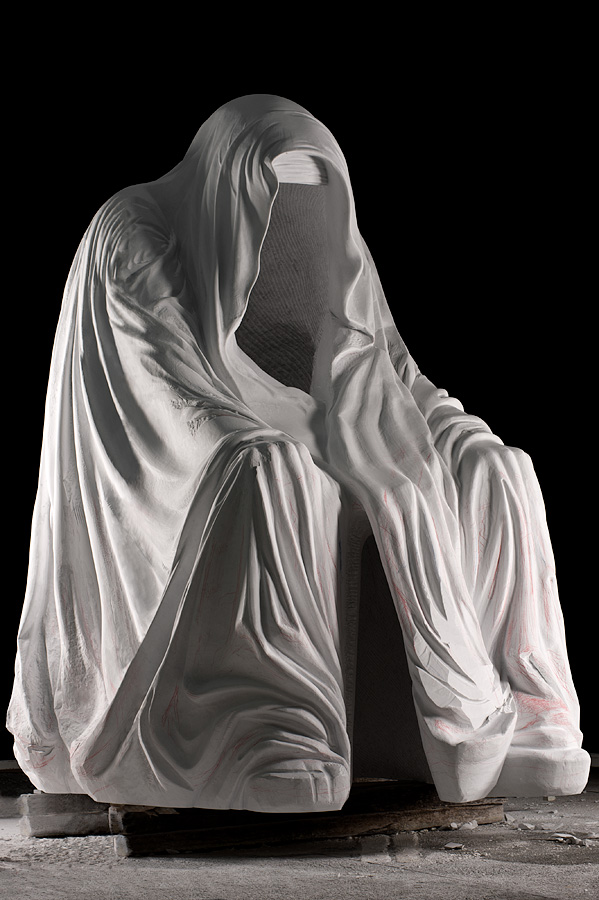
The unfinished "Cloak of Conscience" showing entrance to hollow center

The Cloak of Conscience is the culmination of numerous depictions of a faceless figure hooded and shrouded in cloth. The first appeared in Chromy's painting 'To Be Or Not To Be', in 1980, which in turn had been inspired by the play Jedermann by Hugo von Hofmannsthal and Don Giovanni by Mozart. In previous iterations, the Cloak has been given other names. In Salzburg, by the cathedral, it is Pietà, in Prague outside the opera house where Mozart first performed Don Giovanni, it is 'commendatore'; On the north German island of Sylt, where it sits outside the 13th century St. Severin church at Keitum, it is called the Coat of Conscience, as it is at The Royal Palace in Monaco. Here it is placed in the garden where Grace Kelly, as Princess Grace of Monaco, went to read in the afternoon. Andrea Bocelli, the Italian tenor, has a smaller replica in his Forte dei Marmi home, other private owners of small Cloaks include Pope Benedict XVI, the Ferragamo family in Florence and the Ferrero family in Alba.

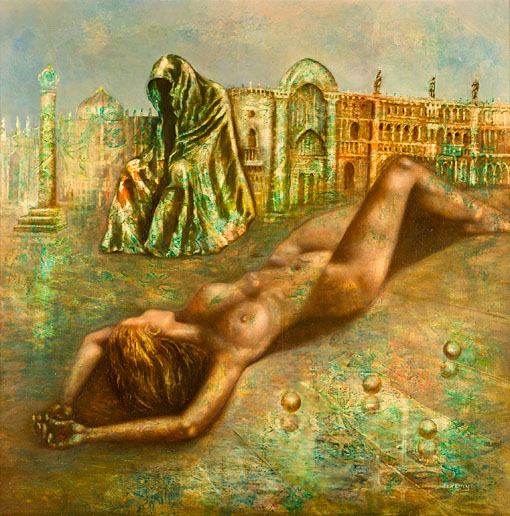
To Be Or Not To Be Chromy, (1980)

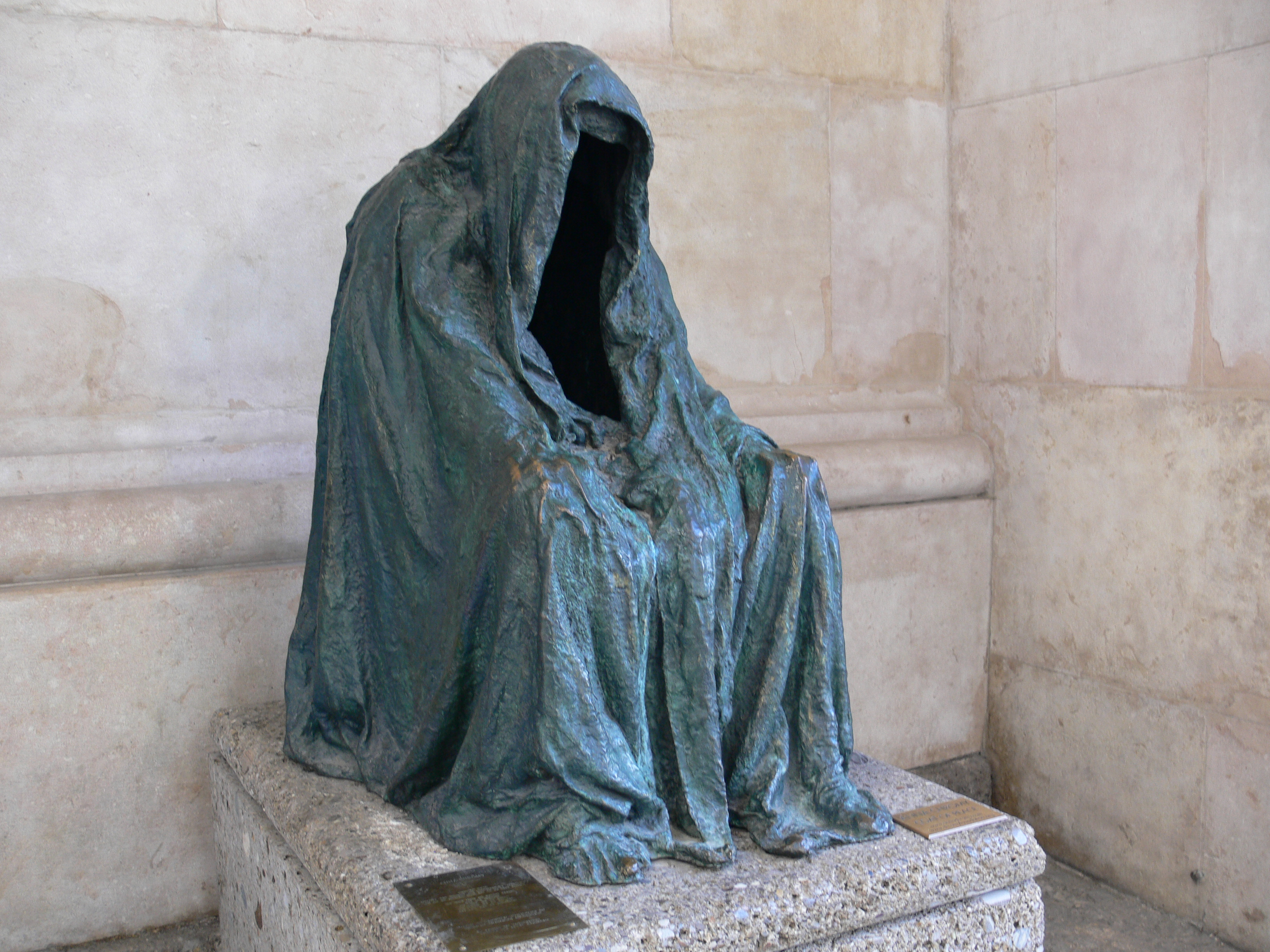
Pietà (Coat of Peace) in Salzburg

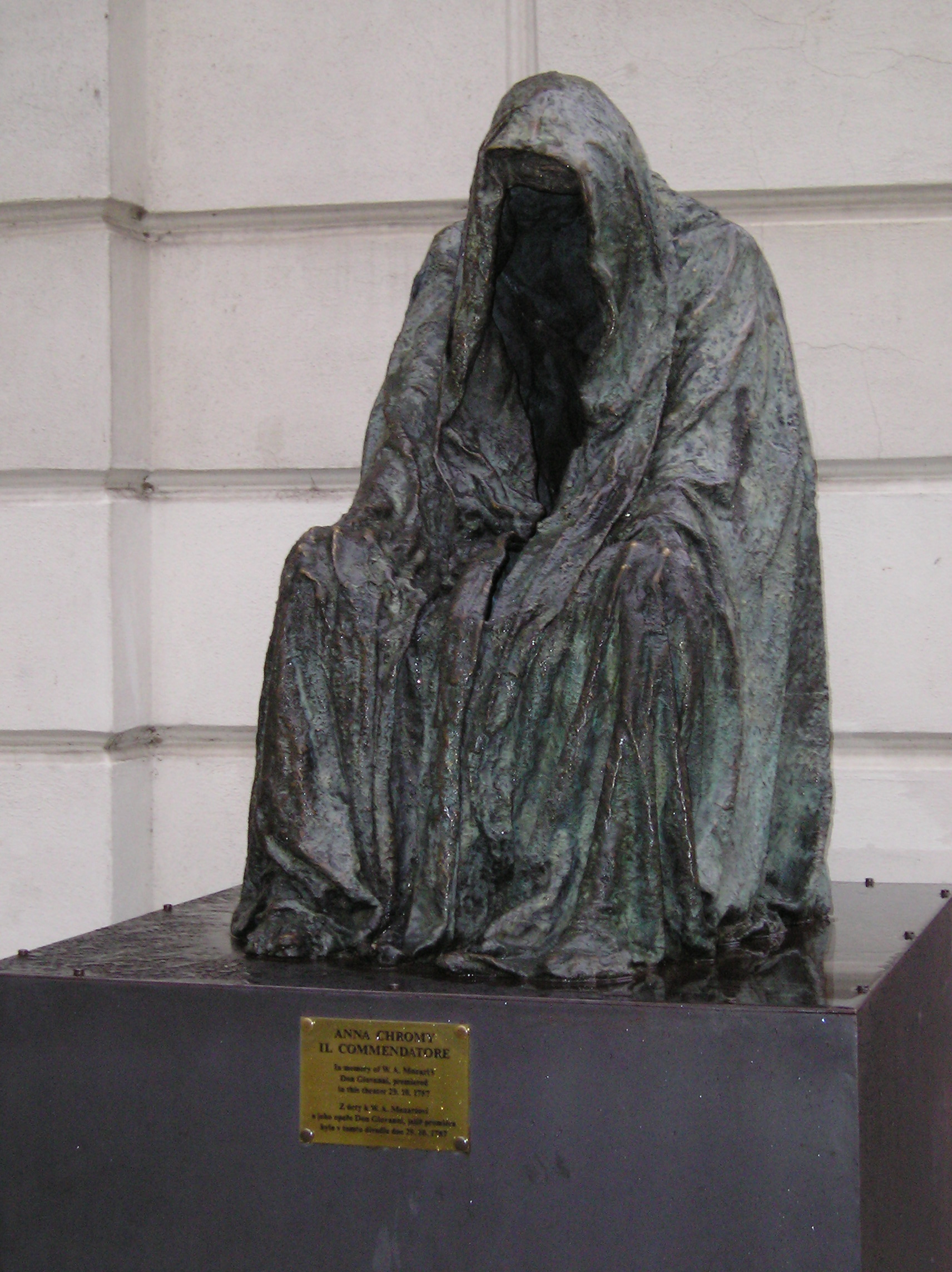
Il Commendatore in Prague

Following Anna Chromy's presentation of the "Heart of the World" sculpture to Pope John Paul II in 2002, in recognition for his role as protector of peace in the world, she also gave a small version of the Cloak in bronze. Shortly afterwards she was approached by The Abbot of the Holy Convent and Papal Basilica San Francesco in Assisi. He wanted to know if she could build the Cloak as a place of spirituality and meditation, following the teaching of St. Francis who considered one's own body or cloak to be a cell in which to find the deepest dimensions of the self. The first brochure, printed to assist creation of the Cloak, had a foreword from John Paul II: “Violence never again! War never again! Terrorism never again! In the name of God, may every religion bring upon earth Justice and Peace, Forgiveness and Life, LOVE!”. So begun, in 2005, the search for a block of marble large enough to accommodate people in prayer inside it. It was found on 24 December 2005 in the Michelangelo Quarry, Carrara.

== Excavation and transportation ==
The Cloak of Conscience is carved from the same pure-white carrara marble favoured by Roman and Renaissance sculptors. The robust and aesthetic quality of this variety of marble results from the method by which it has been subjected to heat and pressure over millions of years beneath the Earth's surface. This has caused its metamorphism from limestone or dolomite to a material composed from an interlocking mosaic of calcium carbonate crystals. Typically marble obtains its colour and patterns from the presence of mineral impurities such as clay, silt, sand, iron oxides or chert, any of which might have been present in granular form inside the original limestone. The pure-white variety, found in the Michelangelo quarry at Carrara, results from a complete absence of such impurities in the limestone from which it originated.

At 250 tonnes, the original block of marble had its centre drilled out in the Michelangelo quarry to reduce its weight as far as possible for transportation down the steep winding road to the Michelangelo Studio, Carrara. This in itself was a feat of logistics and required careful planning and patience to ensure it reached the studio safely.

== Style ==
The scale of Chromy's Cloak of Conscience, and the whiteness of the Carrara marble recalls the art of Bernini (1598–1680): flesh and cloth rendered as stone - the very opposite of its natural material qualities. This has also been referred to as the 'art of petrifaction', recalling Ovid's story of how the animism and 'diverse attitudes' of some marble sculptures can be such that they could be mistaken for real persons, which is a reverse operation in addressing the traditional ambiguity of sculpture.

The apparent aim of Baroque sculptors such as Bernini was to achieve the possibility for marble to appear as both solid and translucent, and to imply a plasticity and weightlessness that is radically at odds with its material quality. Michelangelo too, was masterful at creating the impression of flesh from marble, as seen in his David. However Chromy references this tradition with an inversion of the illusion of stone as flesh. First of all there is no positive analogue of the human body with which we can engage in the view of soft tissue, which almost always demands at least partial nudity. Instead the work is dominated by the folds of cloth and the absent volume of a body, which implies weight — so much weight in fact that we can call this a building (or an architectural sculpture) even a 'chapel', and as such it perhaps has more in common with the use of marble in architecture than in sculpture. In contrast to Rachel Whiteread's procedure of making positive volumes out of negative space, Chromy constructs a negative space out of a solid volume: the human body. The marble therefore becomes a material of strength, a structural material, rather than one that engages in the illusion of weightlessness — in this way it is a different approach to Chromy's works in bronze which, like the sculptures of Ancient Greece, appear to defy gravitational forces by capturing the dynamism of the human body, many of which can be seen in the National Archaeological Museum of Athens, which contains the richest collection of artifacts from Greek antiquity worldwide.

It is outside this museum that one of the Cloak's replicas, a 'Coat of Peace' was placed following Anna Chromy's exhibition there "Antique Myths" in 2007, at which many of her bronze sculptures were displayed, such as Sysiphus (2003).

== Inspiration ==
When asked about her inspiration for The Cloak of Conscience, Anna Chromy quoted Albert Einstein: "The most beautiful experience we can have is the mysterious. It is the fundamental emotion that stands at the cradle of true art and true science...". Chromy tells us her vision, as she set to work on the Cloak, was to create something from 'shining white marble' which is "the physical image of Harmony: harmony between Man, Nature and all Created".

== A Cloak for the World ==
To commemorate completion of The Cloak of Conscience following five years of work, Anna Chromy released A Cloak for the World, a replicable artwork which depicts Cloak dressed in the national flags of 200 countries of the world. The piece was released in November 2010.
