= Anna Chromy =

Czech-German painter and sculptor (1940–2021)

- Born: 18 July 1940; Český Krumlov, Protectorate of Bohemia and Moravia
- Died: 18 September 2021 (aged 81); Monaco
- Known for: Sculpture
- Notable work: Cloak of Conscience, Olympic Spirit, Europe, Ulysses, Sisyphus
- Awards: Premio Michelangelo

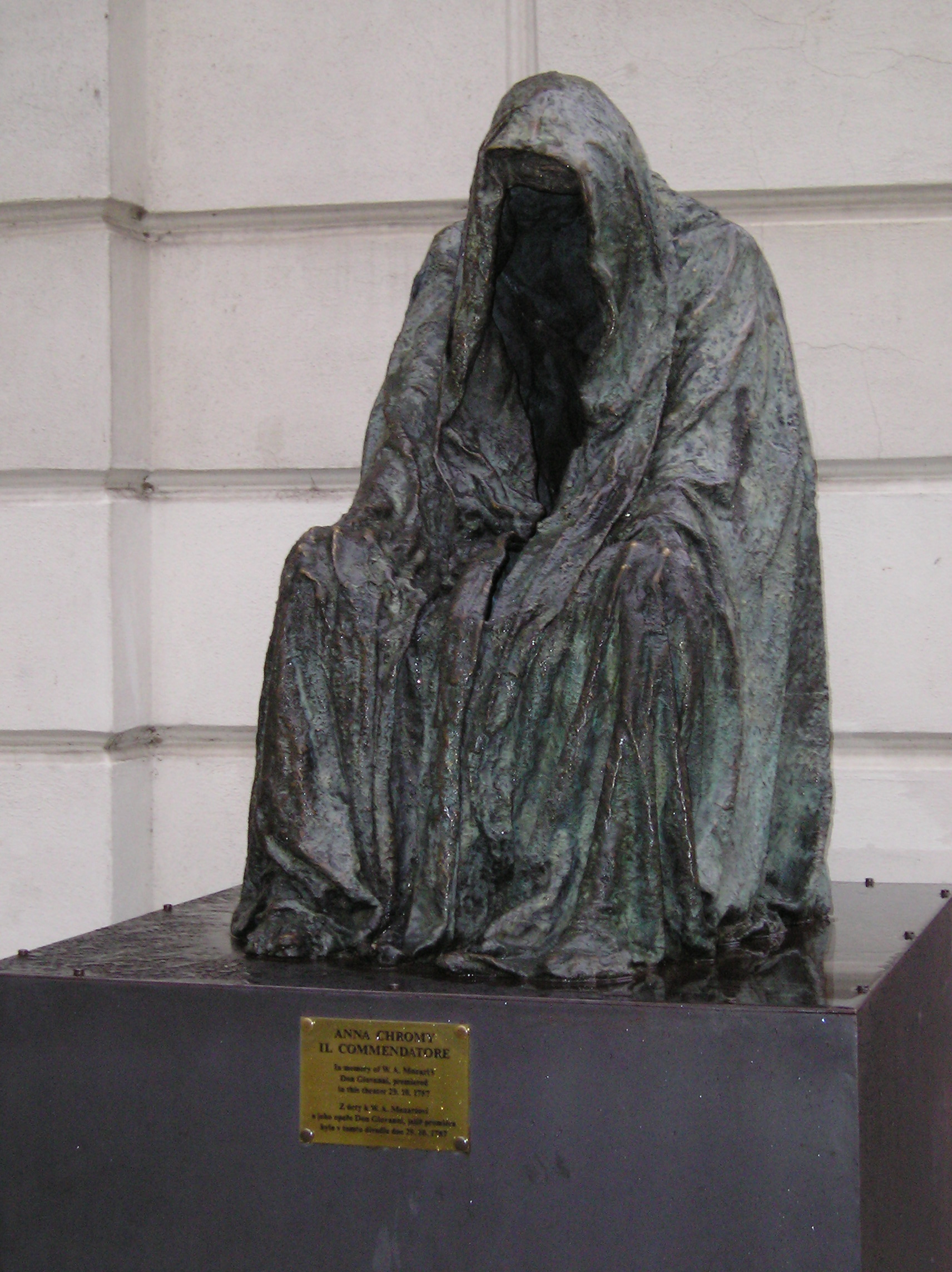
Il Commandatore, in memory of Mozart's Don Giovanni premiered 29 October 1787, in the Estates Theatre in Prague

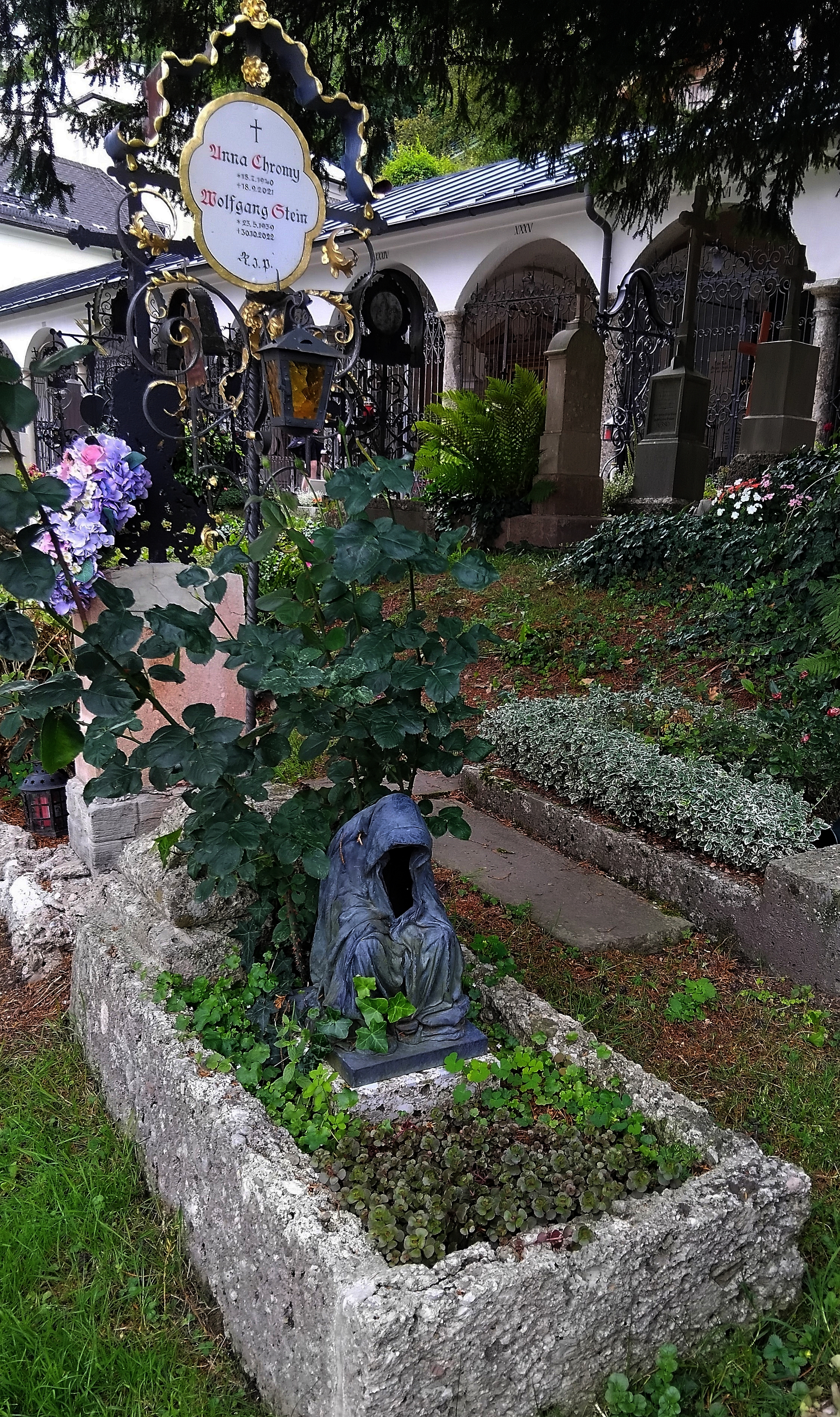
Anna Chromy's grave in Petersfriedhof Salzburg

Anna Chromy (18 July 1940 – 18 September 2021) was a Czech-German painter and sculptor. At the end of World War II, Chromy's family was expelled from Czechoslovakia to Vienna, Austria. Her family did not have enough money for her to attend art school however, so only after she married and moved to Paris was it possible. She received her education at the École des Beaux-Arts. It was here she realised an interest in Salvador Dalí and other surrealists, and began using the soft colours of William Turner in her paintings.

A life-threatening accident in 1992 meant that Chromy was unable to paint for eight years. She turned her attention to sculpture using bronze and marble as her media.

== Biography ==
Anna Chromy was born to a Czech mother and a German father on 18 July 1940, in Český Krumlov, Protectorate of Bohemia and Moravia. Chromy's childhood in Bohemia provided her with her first indulgence in art, and she was often fascinated with images of ancient palaces displaying sculptures, graphics and paintings. After World War II, at the age of five, Chromy and her family were forced to leave Český Krumlov and move to Austria. While in Austria, the musical culture of Vienna and Salzburg made a lasting impression on Chromy, and would eventually be the inspiration for many of her works of art. In 1970, Chromy and her husband, Wolfgang, moved to Barbizon, France, which is southeast of Paris. Here, Chromy was surrounded by artists who came from far and wide to paint the beautiful forests of Fontainebleau. While in Barbizon, Chromy began to study at the Academy de la Grande Chaumire in Paris.

It was during her studies in Paris that Chromy met her mentor, Salvador Dalí, who also became a personal friend. Dali inspired Chromy's imagination and creativity with his personal style of art known as surrealism. Chromy developed an appreciation of Dali's style, and her paintings drew from her admiration of Dali and other artists of surrealism such as Max Ernst, Rene Magritte. She did a charcoal of Dali and Gala titled Homage Dali & Gala, and Dali's image appears in her 1981 oil painting, The Boat of Cadaces.

Beginning in the 1980s, Chromy's work began to be the image of many widely publicized events. In 1985, Chromy created three sketches called the Faces of Peace for the United Nations Year of Peace in New York. Her painting, Man, Earth, Universe, which was Chromy's interpretation of transcendence to a better world, became the official painting of the 1992 World's Fair, also known as EXPO 92, in Seville, Spain. In 1985, Chromy and her husband established a new home in Cap Martin, France, on the Côte d'Azur, where they lived with their three dogs and several cats. Here, Chromy displayed her works of art and decorated it, like by painting a mural of angels on one of the ceilings and dancing figures across her wardrobe doors. She turned one of the rooms into a studio where she painted her Last Supper. The Coat of Saint Martin sits at the entrance of Cap Martin.

Chromy died in Monaco, where she lived from 1980, on 18 September 2021 at the age of 81, and was buried in Petersfriedhof Salzburg.

== Studio ==
Anna Chromy has studios in Pietrasanta, Tuscany where she also has her bronze foundries, Fonderia Artistica Mariani and Massimo Del Chiaro. For her marble sculptures she worked at the studio of Massimo Galleni in Pietrasanta. In Carrara, she sculpted at Studio Michelangelo of Franko.

While living in Cap Martin, Chromy began sculpting marble at the studio of Massimo Galleni in Pietrasanta and Carrara, Italy, as well as at Studio Michelangelo of Franko Barattini. In 2002, Chromy's sculpture, The Heart of the World, was presented to Pope John Paul II in St. Peter's Square in the Vatican. In 2008, Chromy received the Primo Michelangelo which is the highest award for a sculptor in Italy. Never forgetting Austria's musical influence, Chromy was the first sculptor to do the characters of Don Giovanni in life-size bronze. In 2000, Chromy had her showing of her Don Giovanni and the Sound of Bronze Exhibition in Prague. This exhibition brought great exposure. Today, Chromy's fountain of Czech musicians is located in Prague's Senovazne Square. Her sculpture, The Cloak of Conscience, is located in the front entrance of the Stavovske Divadlo. In Prague, Chromy has received several prestigious awards, including the Masaryk, Dali, and Kafka Awards. Chromy's interest in Greek and Roman mythology influenced sculptures such as Europe and Olympic Spirit. All of Chromy's sculptures of mythical figures were displayed on the front terrace of the National Archaeological Museum in Athens, Greece.

== Conscience art ==
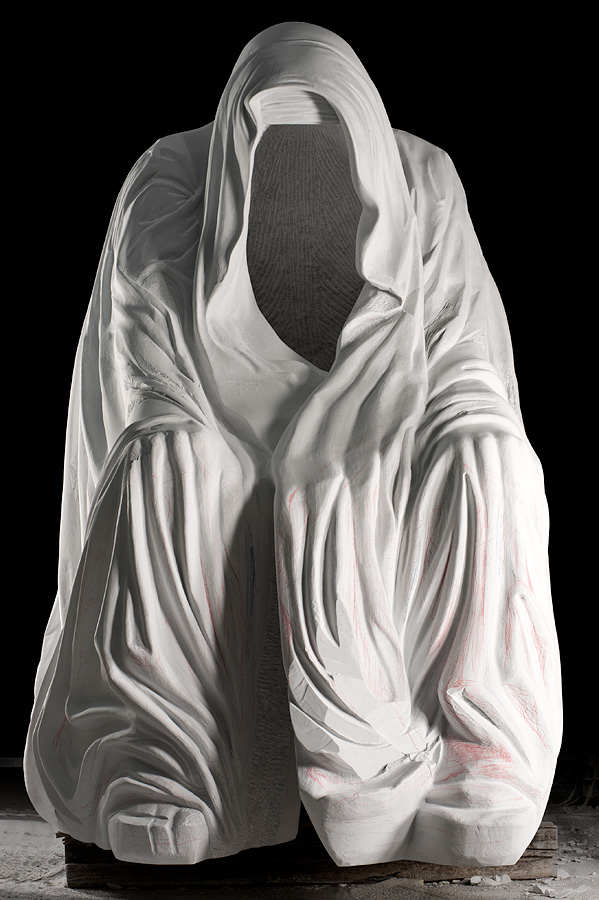
The 15 ft High Cloak of Conscience

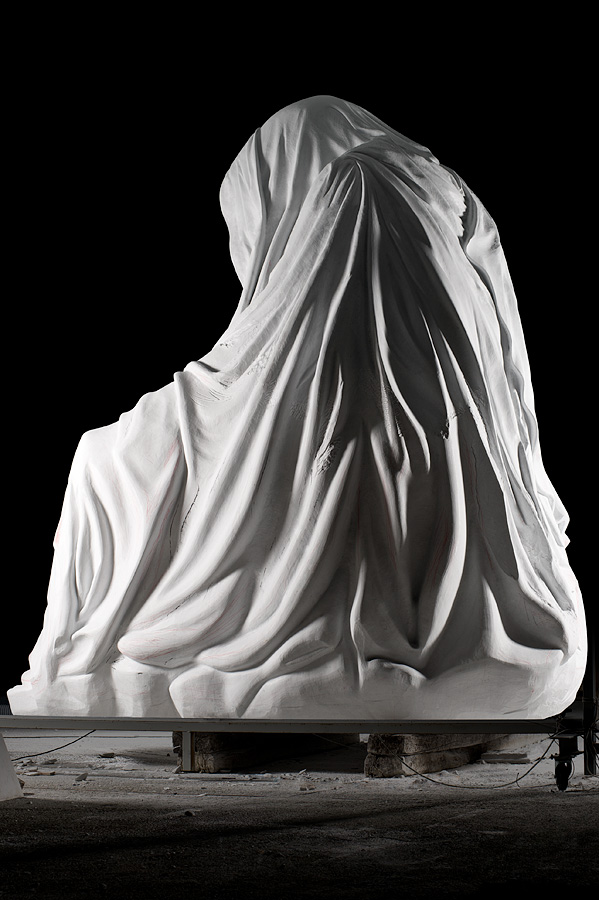
Cloak of Conscience weighs 45 tonnes

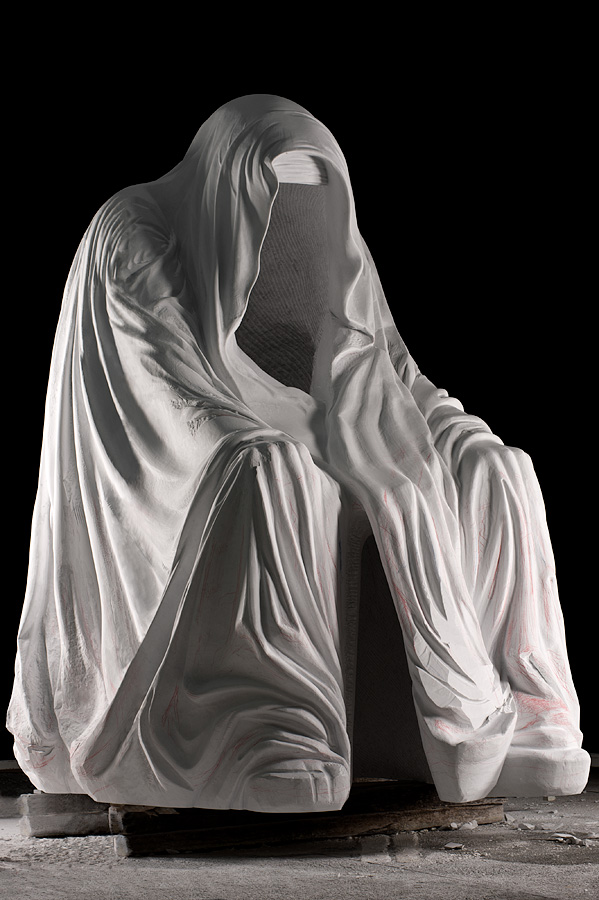
Visitors can walk inside.

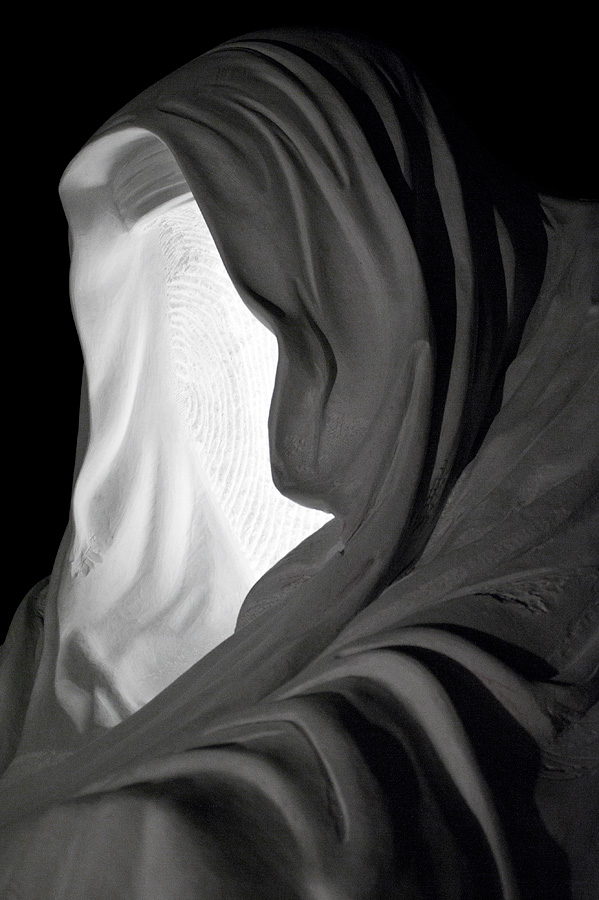
The Cloak of Conscience close up

Chromy's best-known piece is the Cloak of Conscience, Piétà or Commendatore, displayed in Salzburg Cathedral, Austria, the National Archaeological Museum in Athens and the Estates Theatre in Prague, until its subsequent removal in 2025 with city officials citing repeated public misuse.

Other important works include Olympic Spirit and Europe, a contemporary reinterpretation of the Greek myth. In 2009 her Olivier d’Or was presented by Albert II, Prince of Monaco to Nobel Peace Prize winner, Elie Wiesel. In 2008 she presented a model of the Cloak of Conscience to Pope Benedict XVI at Saint Peters in Rome to mark the creation of the Conscience Institute.

== Olympic sculptures ==
In 2012 at the London Olympic Games, Chromy's Olympic Spirit was positioned in the Olympic Village, the home of the athletes for the duration of the games. It was provided as a gift from Lord Moynihan, Chairman of the British Olympic Association, and a compliment to the sportsmen and women competing at the Games. Some of them posed next to it to have their photograph taken, including Matthew Mitcham who climbed to the top of it for his photo. Ulysses, another of the Olympic collection, was positioned in the harbour of Monaco in 2011, and Sisyphus at the University of Pisa.

== Public sculptures ==
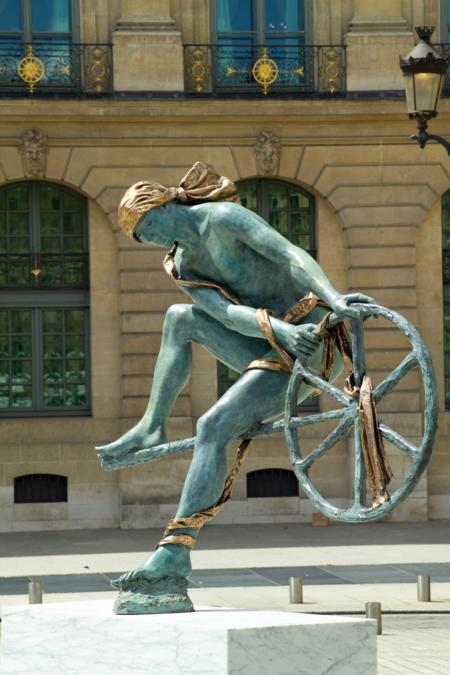
Ulysses (2000)

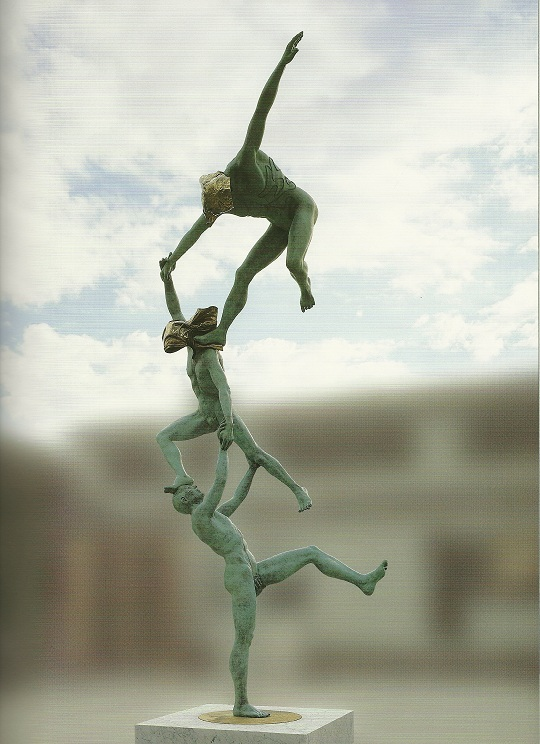
Olympic Spirit (2004)

Chromy draws inspiration from music, opera in particular; classic dance; and the ancient myths. Her paintings contain references to the Vienna School of Fantastic Realism and other Central European artists. Her colours, sometimes used also on sculptures, have a subtle Turner-like touch. She is said to be a quintessential European.

== Exhibitions ==
- Don Giovanni and the Sound of Bronze (2000) in Prague (Czech Republic)
- Il Canto di Orfeo (2004) Pietrasanta (Italy)
- Europe (2005) Place Vendôme, Paris (France)
- Mythos Revisited (2007), National Archaeological Museum, Athens (Greece)
- Dream of the East (2009), Beijing (China)
- Myths of the Mediterranean (2011), Saint-Tropez (France)
- Spiritus Mundi (2012), Foshan (China)

== Chromy Awards ==
The Chromy awards were conceived by Anna Chromy following her study and practice of conscience art. The first award ceremony, in 2013, honoured those individuals who were nominated for their diligence and service to saving humankind or the Earth, or both, in the work they do. The first nominees included people like Bill Gates, Desmond Tutu, Aung San Suu Kyi and Gene Sharp. Following completion of The Cloak of Conscience, and on further reflection of her life's work, Chromy painted a series of oils on canvas in 2012 called Chromology. These were created to reflect the emotion, purpose and meaning of those who might win a Chromy award. These paintings were later added to, and the entire collection became Chromatology.

== Earlier paintings ==
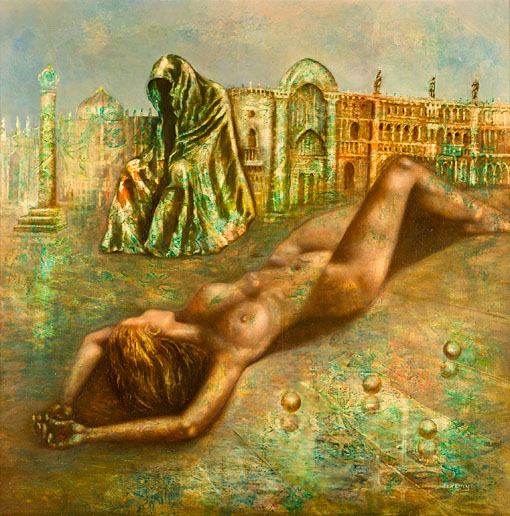
'To be or not to be', 1982

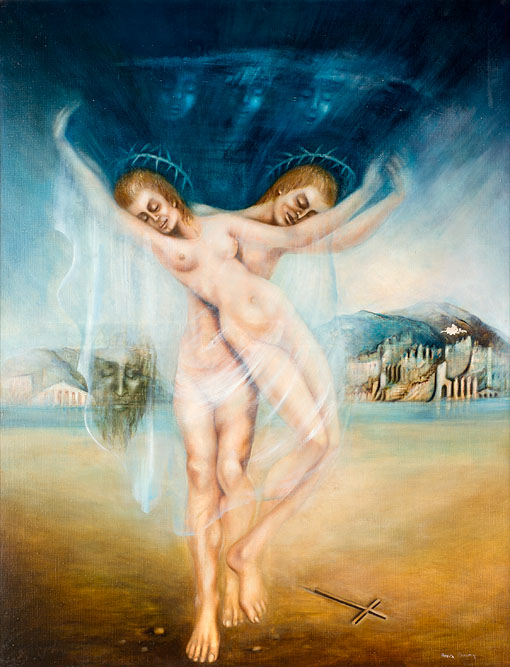
'Eternal Love', 1979

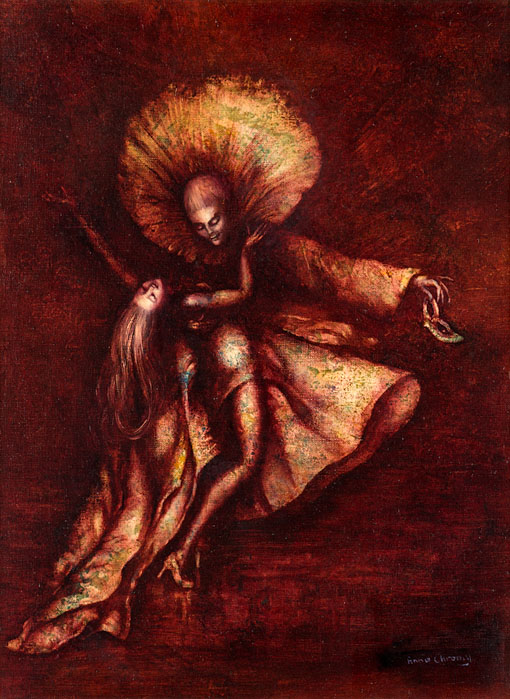
'Ball in Venice', 1979

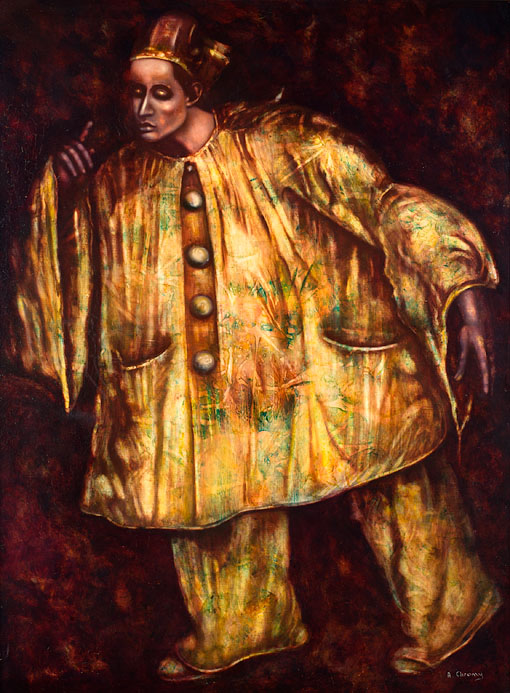
'Clown', 1979

== In China ==
Anna Chromy has gathered interest in China since 1995 when she was honorary guest at the Guangzhou-art-fair. In the time since then her popularity has grown in the region. In December 2011, at her exhibition in Foshan, Qiao Hua, Director of the Grandfather Art Gallery, formalised her popularity when he said her works have won the favour of collectors in China. She has been invited to exhibit her entire collection for the first time at the National Museum of China, on Tiananmen Square in Beijing. In June 2012, during the placement of Chromy's Olympic Spirit in the National Academy of Sculpture in Beijing, Wu Weishan, Director of the Academy appointed Anna Chromy Honorary Fellow in the National Academy.
