= Kupelwieser-Schlössl =

Kupelwieser Castle
- Kupelwieser-Schlössl
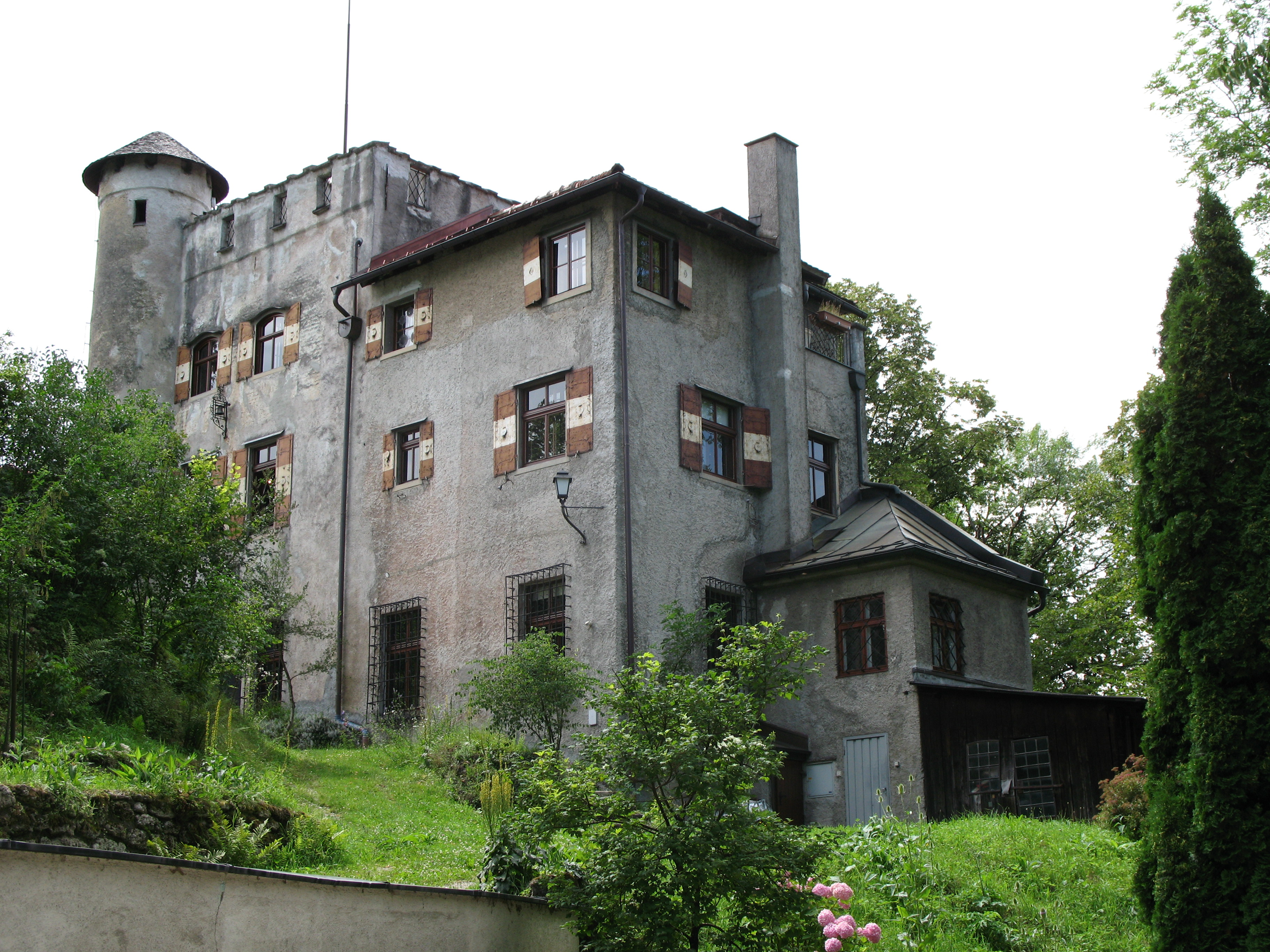
- Kupelwieser Castle on the Mönchsberg
- Interactive map of the Kupelwieser Castle area
- Alternative names: Falkenturm, Konstantinturm, Marienschlössl, Stauffenegg

General information
- Architectural style: Neo-Gothic
- Location: Mönchsberg 17, Salzburg, Austria
- Completed: 1863
- Renovated: 1912

Kupelwieser Castle (German: Kupelwieser-Schlössl, also known as Falkenturm, Konstantinturm, Marienschlössl or Stauffenegg) is a neo-Gothic villa on the Mönchsberg hill in Salzburg, Austria. Since 1995 it has been protected as a historic monument.

== History ==
The site was first mentioned in 1364, when a carpenter named Wolfhart and his family received the land near the *Falkenturm* ("Falcon Tower") as a fief for the hospital in Mülln. The tower was used by the archbishops for falconry. Later it came into the possession of the cathedral chapter and was called *Tumherrenturm* (1389) and *Tumpropsteiturm* (1417). In 1612 it was leased to Count Konstantin von Liechtenstein, from whom the name *Konstantinturm* derives. In 1642 the property was sold to the "Hohe Salzburger Landschaft" for fortification purposes.

In 1674 St. Peter's Abbey acquired the land and established the Konstantinmeierei, consisting of a residential house, oven, barn and other farm buildings. Due to low income, it was auctioned off in 1822. The tower, in danger of collapse, fell down in 1831. After that, several owners followed in quick succession.

In 1863 the property was purchased by the musician Joseph Christoph Achleitner, court zither player of King Otto of Greece. After Otto's deposition, Achleitner settled in Salzburg, demolished the ruins and built a new villa with a neo-Gothic tower and interiors with wood panelling and stained-glass windows. After his death in 1891, the property went to his widow and son, who sold it to Marie Geisberg. The house was run as a guesthouse under the name *Marienschlössl*. In 1902 it was bought by Marie Fischer of Dresden.

On 2 December 1912 the industrialist Franz Kupelwieser bought the estate (4,441 m^{2} for 39,000 Kronen). He enlarged the villa, added a gatehouse in 1913, a "Rittersaal" (knight's hall) with stained-glass windows, and further annexes. His son, the physiologist Ernst Kupelwieser, expanded the house in the 1930s and 1950s, adding a library and terrace. In 1953 he contributed a lion head fountain to the garden wall, and in 1987 the family coat of arms was placed on the gatehouse.

After Ernst's death in 1964 the house passed to his daughter Gerheid Widrich, a physician and the first woman in the Salzburg state government, and her husband Hans Widrich, long-time press officer of the Salzburg Festival and president of the Salzburg Kunstverein.

== Cultural significance ==
The villa became a meeting place for artists in the 20th century. Bertolt Brecht stayed briefly in 1948, Gottfried von Einem was a regular guest, and the composer Pierre Boulez lived in the gatehouse during the Salzburg Festival in 1992, 1994 and 1996.

Between 1979 and 1988 the Nobel Prize laureate Peter Handke resided here with his then wife Libgart Schwarz and daughter Amina. During this period he wrote or translated several works, including Die Wiederholung, Die Abwesenheit, Kindergeschichte, Der Chinese des Schmerzes, Nachmittag eines Schriftstellers and many translations of Aeschylus, Shakespeare, Jean Genet and others. Handke later processed these years in his essays and memoirs.

Parts of the screenplay for Wings of Desire (Der Himmel über Berlin) by Wim Wenders and Handke were written here, and scenes were rehearsed in the garden with actress Solveig Dommartin.

== Today ==
The castle remains privately owned. Among the current owners is the filmmaker Virgil Widrich, a descendant of the Kupelwieser family. The garden contains sculptures by Erwin Reiter, Werner Würtinger, Pino Castagna and Hans Kupelwieser.

== Family Kupelwieser ==
The Kupelwieser family originally came from the Ultental valley in South Tyrol (village of Kuppelwies, today Pracupola/Val d’Ultimo). Important members include the painter Leopold Kupelwieser (1796–1862), friend of Franz Schubert and professor at the Vienna Academy, Franz Kupelwieser (1830–1903), professor of metallurgy and first rector of the Montanuniversität Leoben, and Ernst Kupelwieser (1890–1964), physiologist and pioneer of soybean research and founder of the Austrian Soybean Society.

== Gallery ==
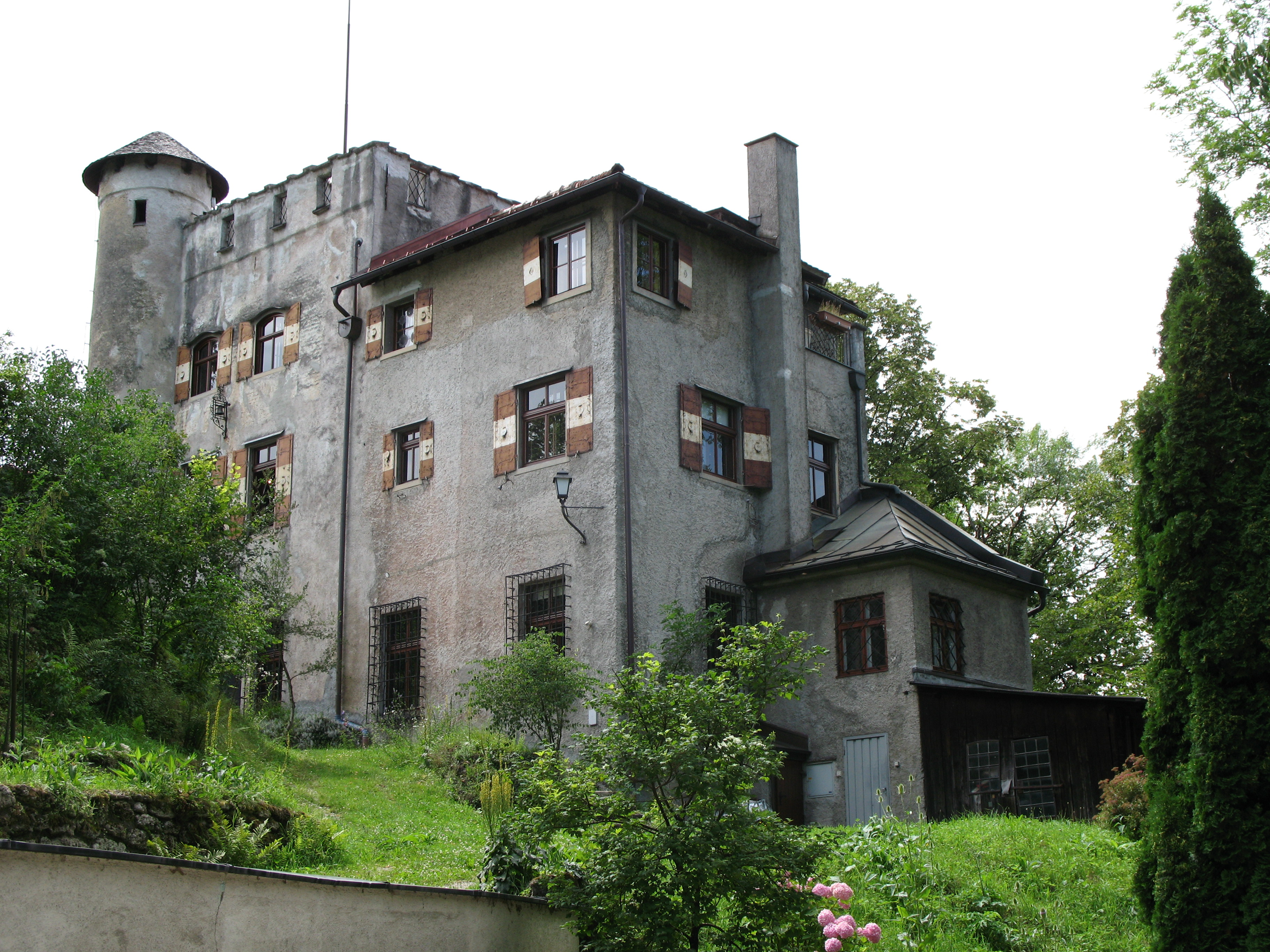
View of Kupelwieser Castle

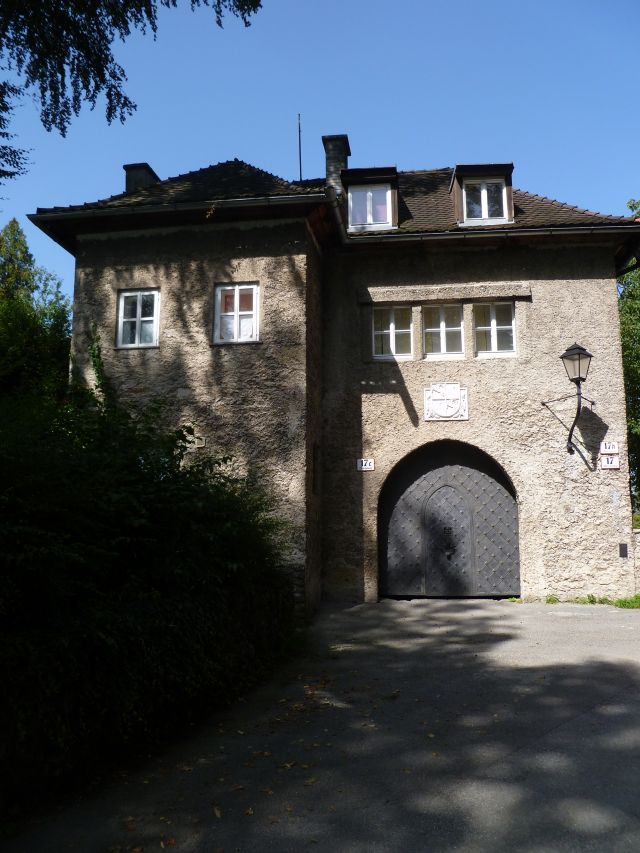
Gatehouse (built 1913)

== Sources ==
- Adolf Frank: Der Mönchsberg und seine Baulichkeiten. In: Mitteilungen der Gesellschaft für Salzburger Landeskunde, vol. 70, Salzburg 1930 (in German).
- Hans Widrich: Hundert Jahre Kupelwieser auf dem Mönchsberg. Eine kleine Haus- und Familiengeschichte. Salzburg 2012 (in German).
- Magda Krön: Das Kupelwieser-Schlössl auf dem Mönchsberg. In: Bastei – Magazin des Stadtvereins Salzburg, vol. 65, 2016 (in German).
- Reinhard Medicus: Salzburgs Stadtberge und Stadtgärten im Wandel der Zeit. Salzburg 2021 (in German).
- Christian F. Uhlir (ed.): Salzburger Stadtberge. Mönchsberg – Kapuzinerberg – Festungsberg – Nonnberg – Rainberg. Salzburg 2011.
- Reinhard Medicus: Literarischer Spaziergang: Gottfried von Einem und Peter Handke. Stadt Salzburg, 2019 (in German).
