= Saint Peter's Abbey, Salzburg =

Benedictine monastery in Salzburg, Austria

Coordinates: 47°47′49″N 13°02′45″E

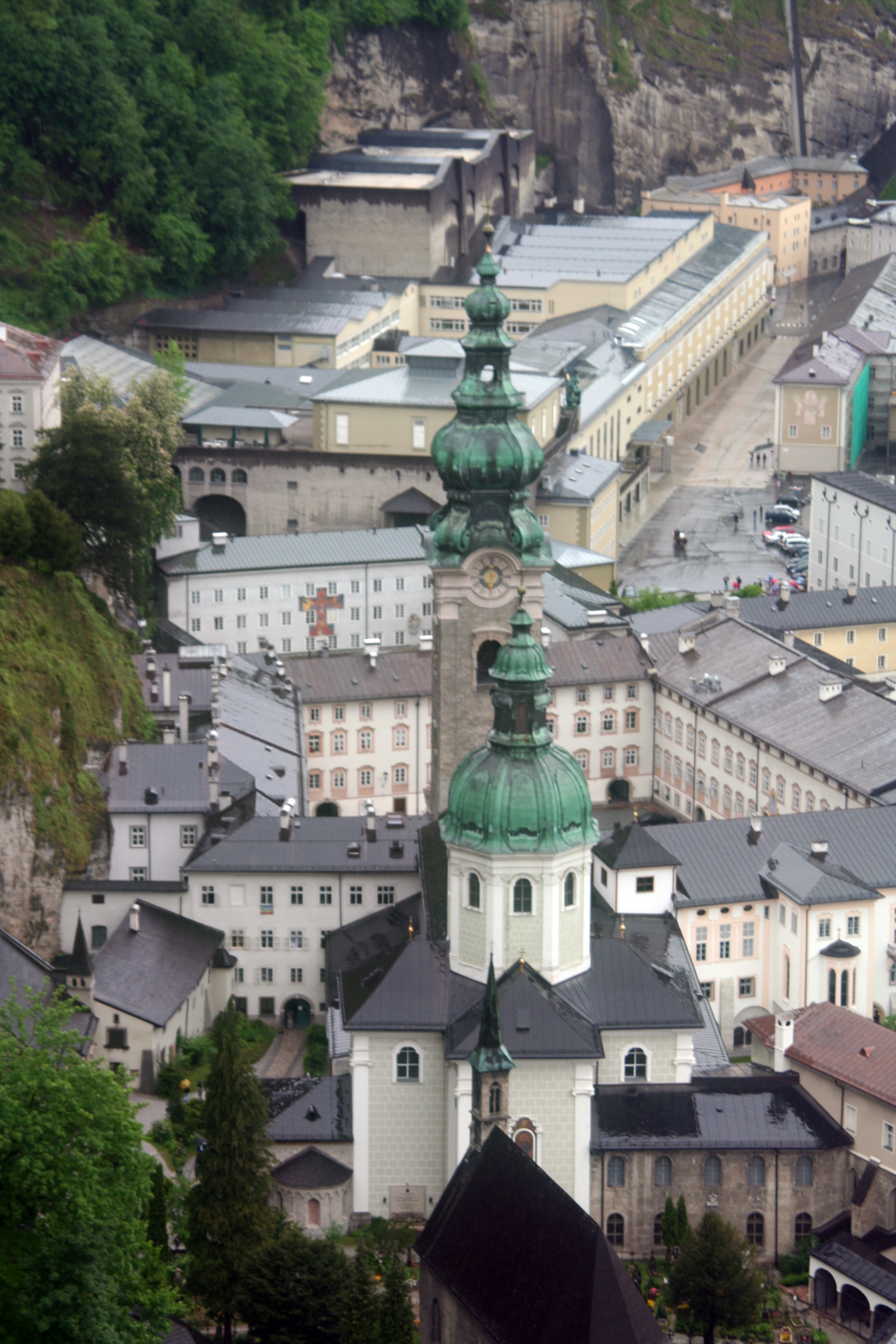
St. Peter's Abbey Church and monastery, view from Hohensalzburg Fortress

St Peter's Abbey (German: Stift Sankt Peter), or St Peter's Archabbey (German: Erzabtei Stift Sankt Peter, Latin: Archiabbatia sancti Petri Salisburgensis), is a Benedictine monastery and former cathedral in the Austrian city of Salzburg. It is considered one of the oldest monasteries in the German-speaking area, and in fact the oldest with a continuous history since its foundation in 696.

== History ==
St Peter's Abbey was founded in 696 by Saint Rupert at the site of a Late Antique church stemming from the first Christianization in the area in the days of Severinus of Noricum. Likewise the establishment of the monastery was meant to advance missionary efforts in the Eastern Alps. Until 987, the office of the abbot was joined to that of the Archbishop of Salzburg: one man fulfilled both duties.

In the Middle Ages, St Peter's was known for its exceptional school. In 1074, Archbishop Gebhard of Salzburg sent several monks to found Admont Abbey in the March of Styria. In the 15th century, the abbey adopted the Melk Reforms. A pipe organ was built at the abbey by Daniel Hayl the younger in the years 1618 through 1620. In 1623, Archbishop Paris Lodron founded the Benedictine University of Salzburg, which until its dissolution in 1810 was closely connected to the abbey.

Since 1641, the abbey has been a member of the Salzburg Congregation, merged in 1930 into the present Austrian Congregation (of which it is the principal house) of the Benedictine Confederation.

In 1926, endeavours for re-establishing the Salzburg university led to the foundation of the Benedictine college (Kolleg St. Benedikt); the initiative helped bring the modern University of Salzburg back into being. In 1927, St Peter's was raised to the status of an archabbey. Following the Austrian Anschluss to Nazi Germany in 1938, the premises were seized and most of the monks expelled. Nevertheless, the monastery was not dissolved and the monks returned after the war.

== Abbey church ==
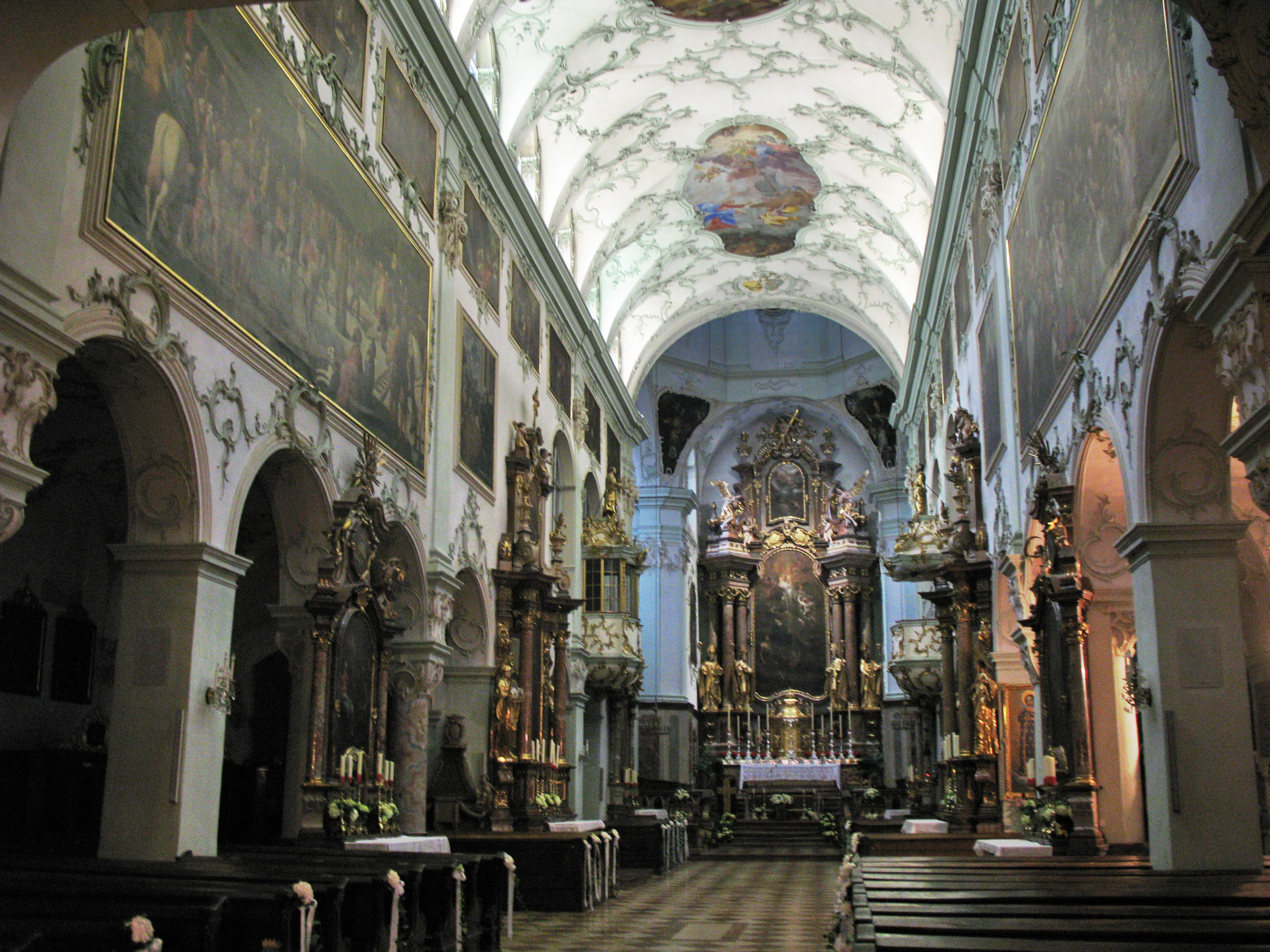
Abbey Church, interior

The present-day Romanesque abbey church at the northern foot of the Mönchsberg was erected from about 1130 onwards at the site of a previous Carolingian church building, it was dedicated to Saint Peter in 1147. One of the organs was located atop the rood screen in 1444, a work by Heinrich Traxdorf of Mainz. While the steeple received its onion dome in 1756, the interior was often re-modelled before attaining its currently visible Rococo style between 1760 and 1782 under Abbot Beda Seeauer's direction. The high altar is a work by Martin Johann Schmidt. The St. Mary's Chapel contains the grave of Abbot Johann von Staupitz (d. 1524), who was Martin Luther's superior; they were both Augustinian monks in Germany at the time.

Mozart's Great Mass in C minor was scheduled to premiere in the church, probably on 26 October 1783, with his wife Constanze singing first soprano. However, the work remained incomplete.

Next to the altar where St. Rupert was originally entombed lie the tombs of Mozart's sister Maria Anna Mozart (Nannerl) and Johann Michael Haydn. Also entombed at St. Peter's Abbey is St. Vitalis.

== Library, archives and other collections ==
=== Library ===
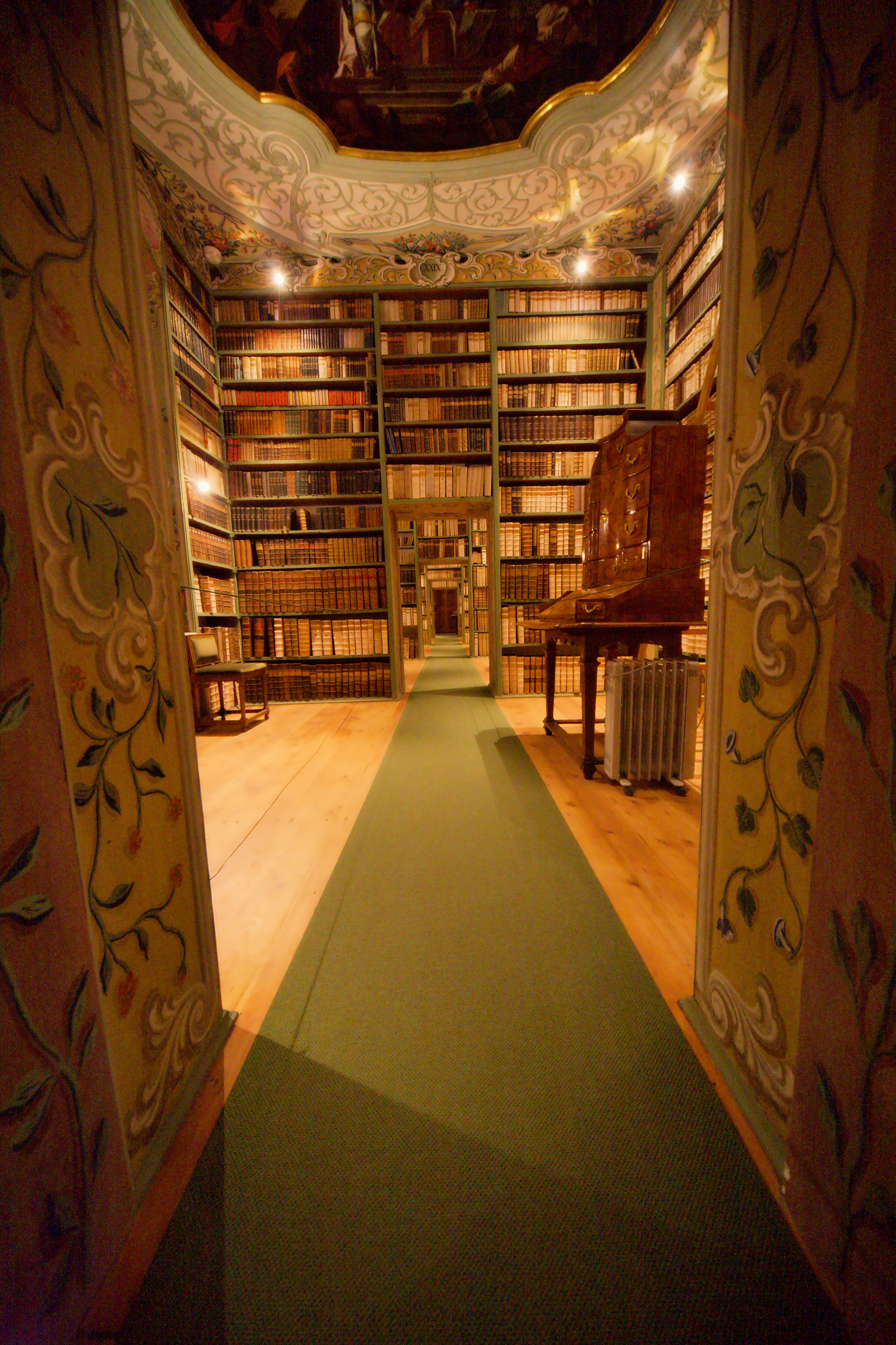
Library

St Peter's houses the oldest library in Austria. Among the 800 manuscripts the most precious is the Verbrüderungsbuch, which was deposited in 784 by Bishop Virgil. Through continual acquisition, the library has grown to 100,000 volumes, focusing particularly on Benedictine monasticism, medieval church history, history of art, and items relating to the local history of Salzburg, or Salisburgensia. Special collections include incunabula and early editions, graphics including the devotional images collection of Father Gregor Reitlechner and the map collection.

In 1768, Abbot Beda Seeauer had the medieval Zellenbibliothek converted to the Rococo style. In 1999, it was restored. It is accessible by special permission.

=== Archives ===
The archive is for the purposes of abbey administration and the researching of its history. It contains documents from the 8th to the 20th centuries, in the following series:

1. Deeds: c. 4,300 deeds up to 1700;
2. Manuscripts Series A: chronicles, journals, chapter minutes, visitations, endowments, necrologies and rolls, inventories, accounts and so on;
3. Manuscripts Series B: official records of estate ownership (cartularies, registers, feodaries, court records);
4. Files: records and correspondence of the abbots, the monks, the chancery and other administrative offices of the abbey; files relating to estate ownership;
5. Other: photographs, maps and plans.

=== Music archive ===
As a result of contact with notable musicians of Salzburg, St Peter's possesses a significant collection, much of it in holograph, with works by Johann Ernst Eberlin, Anton Cajetan Adlgasser, Leopold and Wolfgang Amadeus Mozart, Joseph Haydn, Sigismund von Neukomm, Robert Führer, and Karl Santner.

=== Other collections ===
The abbey also owns collections of paintings, church treasures, artworks, minerals, furniture, musical instruments, a coin cabinet, and a cabinet of natural curiosities (not accessible).

== Institutes in St Peter's ==
=== Institute for Benedictine Studies ===
In order to give young German-speaking Benedictine monks and nuns the opportunity to learn more about monastic subjects, the Salzburg Abbots' Conference set up an Institute for Benedictine Studies in 2000. It was devoted to the research on the Rule of St Benedict. The Institute closed when the director, Michaela Puzicha, retired in 2022.

=== Austrian Liturgical Institute ===
St. Peter's was one of the earliest centers of liturgical revival in Austria. Since 2001, the Austrian Bishops' Conference's Liturgical Institute has been based in the archabbey.

== Cemetery ==
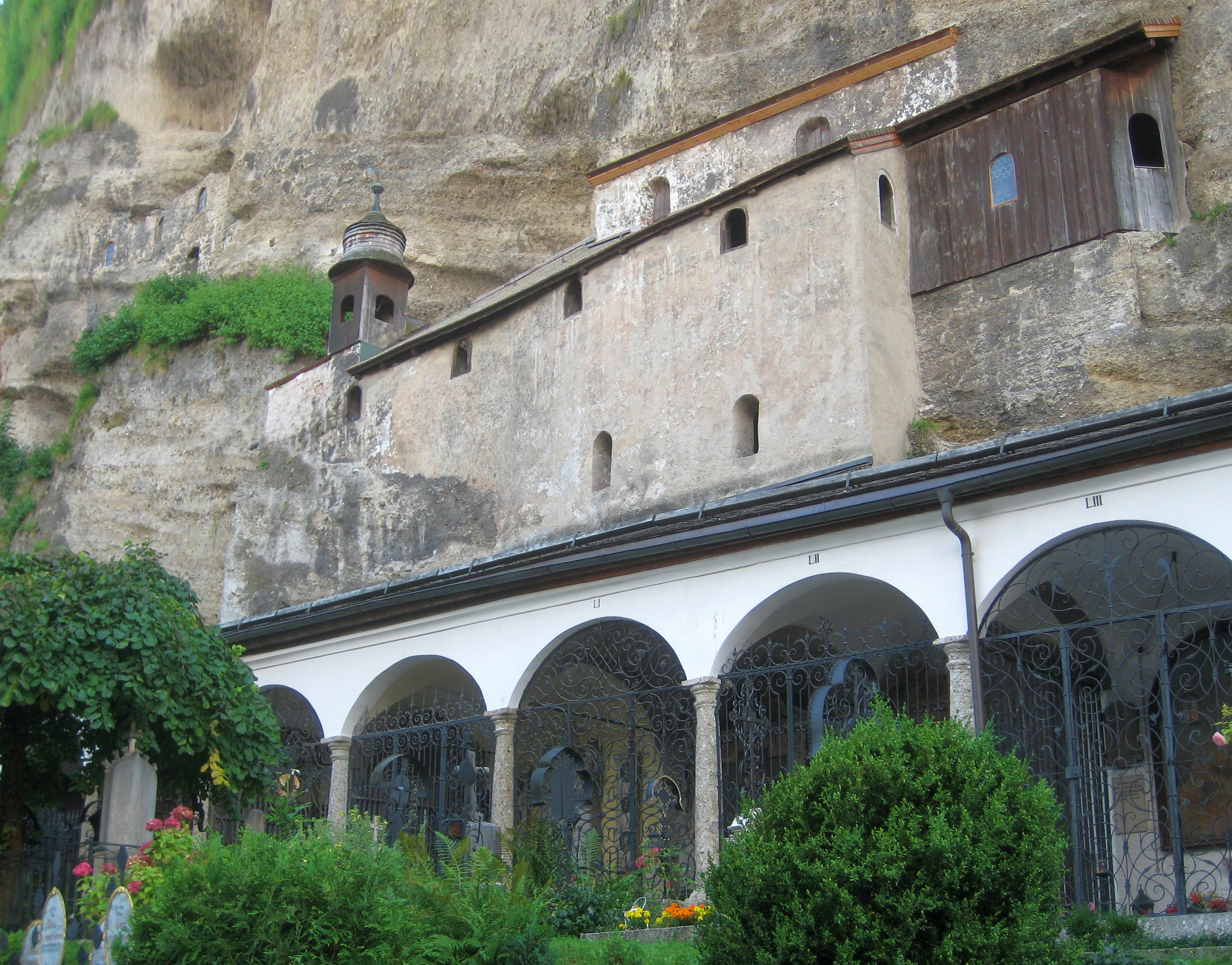
St Peter's Cemetery

The Petersfriedhof was probably laid out during the foundation of the monastery about 700. The burial ground was first mentioned under the rule of Archbishop Conrad I in 1139, with the oldest preserved graves from 1288 and 1300. It is centred around Late Gothic St Margaret's Chapel and the Chapel of the Cross, dedicated about 1170 and refurbished as a mausoleum according to plans by Santino Solari in 1614/15. Several tombs are located in arcades built at the foot of the Festungsberg hill.

The cemetery grounds are known for its 'catacombs' carved out of the conglomerate rocks of the Festungsberg. They probably date back to Late Antiquity, when they served as an Early Christian place of assembly and hermitage. They include two chapels dedicated to Saint Gertrude and one Christian martyr Maximus by Archbishop Conrad of Wittelsbach in 1172 and 1178.

Mozart's sister Nannerl and the popular Fascist sculptor Josef Thorak lay buried here, among many other dignitaries.

== Stiftskulinarium ==
The St. Peter Stiftskulinarium was first mentioned in an 803 deed issued by Alcuin of York, an English scholar attendant Emperor Charlemagne; it therefore claims to be the oldest restaurant in Central Europe.
