= St. Anne's Church, Vienna =

Church in Vienna, Austria

St. Anne's Church
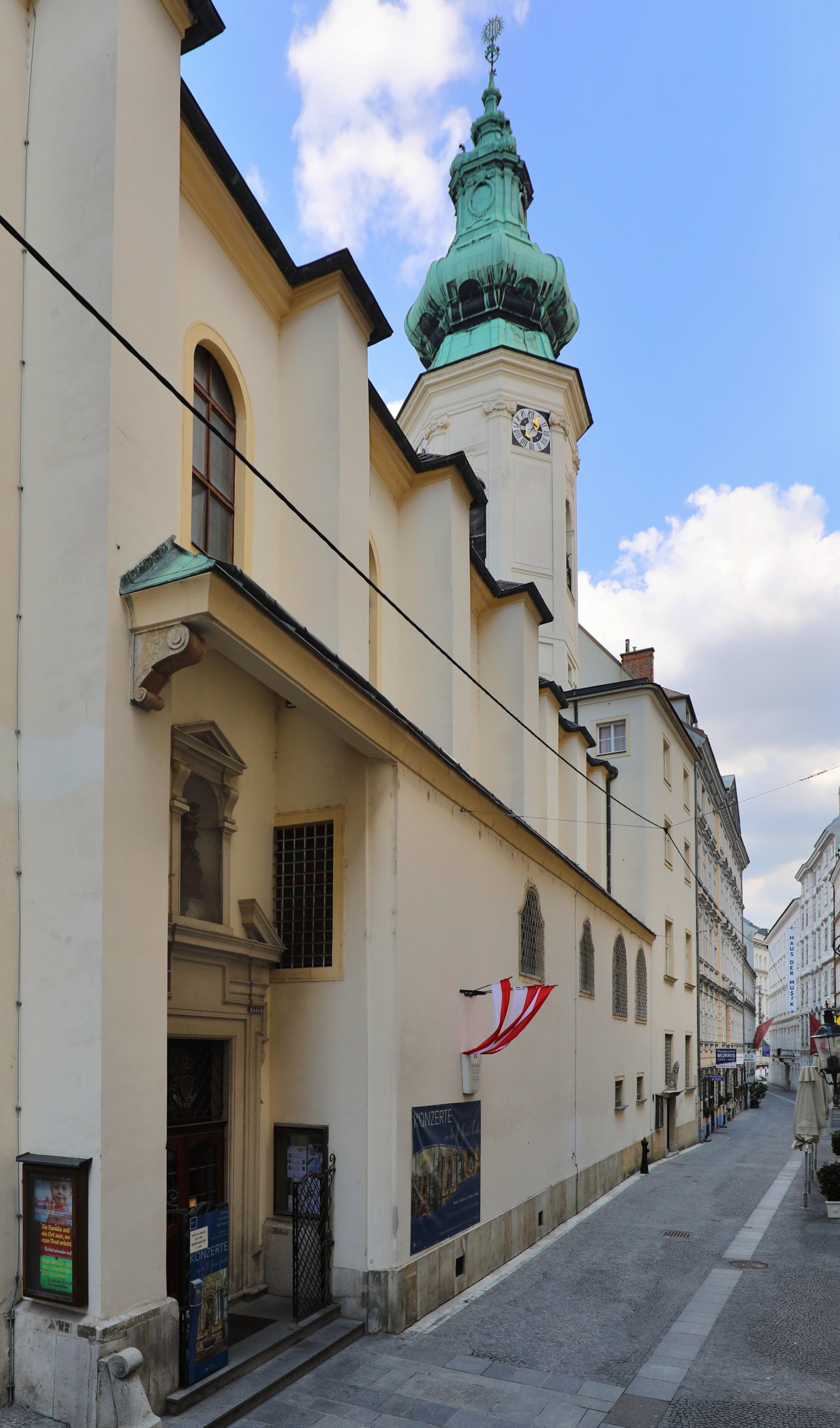
- St. Anne's Church, Vienna, Austria

- Location within Vienna Location within Austria

Religion
- Affiliation: Catholic Church
- Leadership: P. Dr. Maximilian Hofinger osfs
- Year consecrated: 1518

Location
- Location: Vienna, Austria
- Coordinates: 48.2044°N 16.3716°E

Architecture
- Type: Church
- Style: Gothic, Baroque

Specifications
- Direction of façade: SSW
- Capacity: 250
- Length: 35 m (115 ft)
- Width: 10 m (33 ft)

Website
- www.annakirche.at

St. Anne's Church (German: Annakirche) is located in Vienna, Austria, and has been administered by the Oblates of St. Francis de Sales since 1906. A relic of Saint Anne—her right hand—is kept in a rich Baroque setting and exhibited every year on July 26.

== History ==
St. Anne's chapel has existed since 1320. In 1518, the Gothic church was consecrated on the occasion of Saint Anne's Day (26 July). The church was administered first by the Poor Clare Sisters, then by the Jesuits. Between 1629 and 1634, the Jesuits started the Baroquisation of the Gothic church. After a fire in 1747, Pozzo's pupil Christoph Tausch transformed it into late baroque using trompe l'oeil techniques. On 25 June 1747 lightning struck the tower of the church, burning down the roof framing but leaving intact the frescos. In 1751, Daniel Gran began the renovation of the interior, blackened by candle smoke. In 1773, the Jesuit order was dissolved. After starting to work in the church in 1897, the Oblates of St. Francis de Sales received the church in 1906.

Gran's frescos were renovated in the 19th century and again in 1969–1970. The 1976 Friuli earthquake, which killed 1,000 people in Northeastern Italy, damaged the church. From 2003 to 2005, the Annakirche was renovated under the auspices of the Federal Monuments Office Vienna.

== Architecture ==
Daniel Gran created the three ceiling frescos, the high altar painting, and the frescos in the Franz Xaver chapel. The wood-carved statue representing Saint Anne with Virgin Mary and the Christ Child dates back to 1510 and is attributed to Veit Stoss. The side altarpieces were executed by Kremser Schmidt. Christoph Tausch has responsibility for the spatial arrangement.

The organ was made by the Austrian organ builder Johann Hencke (3 December 1697 Geseke – 24 September 1766 Vienna).

St. Anne's Church is famous for its frescos by Daniel Gran. The topics of the frescoes are:

- The Glory of St. Anne
- The Glory of the Virgin Mary
- The Glory of the new born Christ Child

== Gallery ==
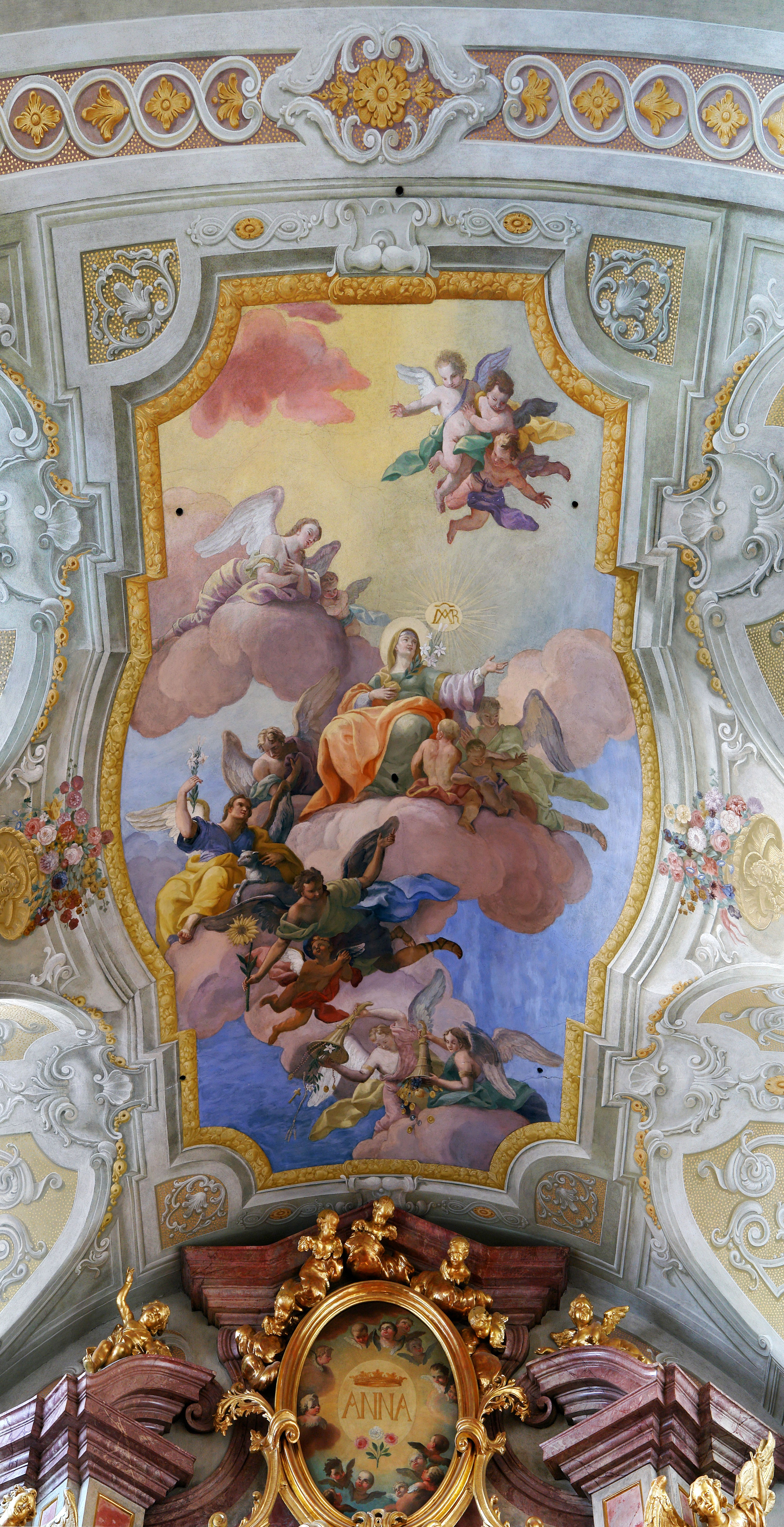
Ceiling fresco depicting St. Anne, by Daniel Gran

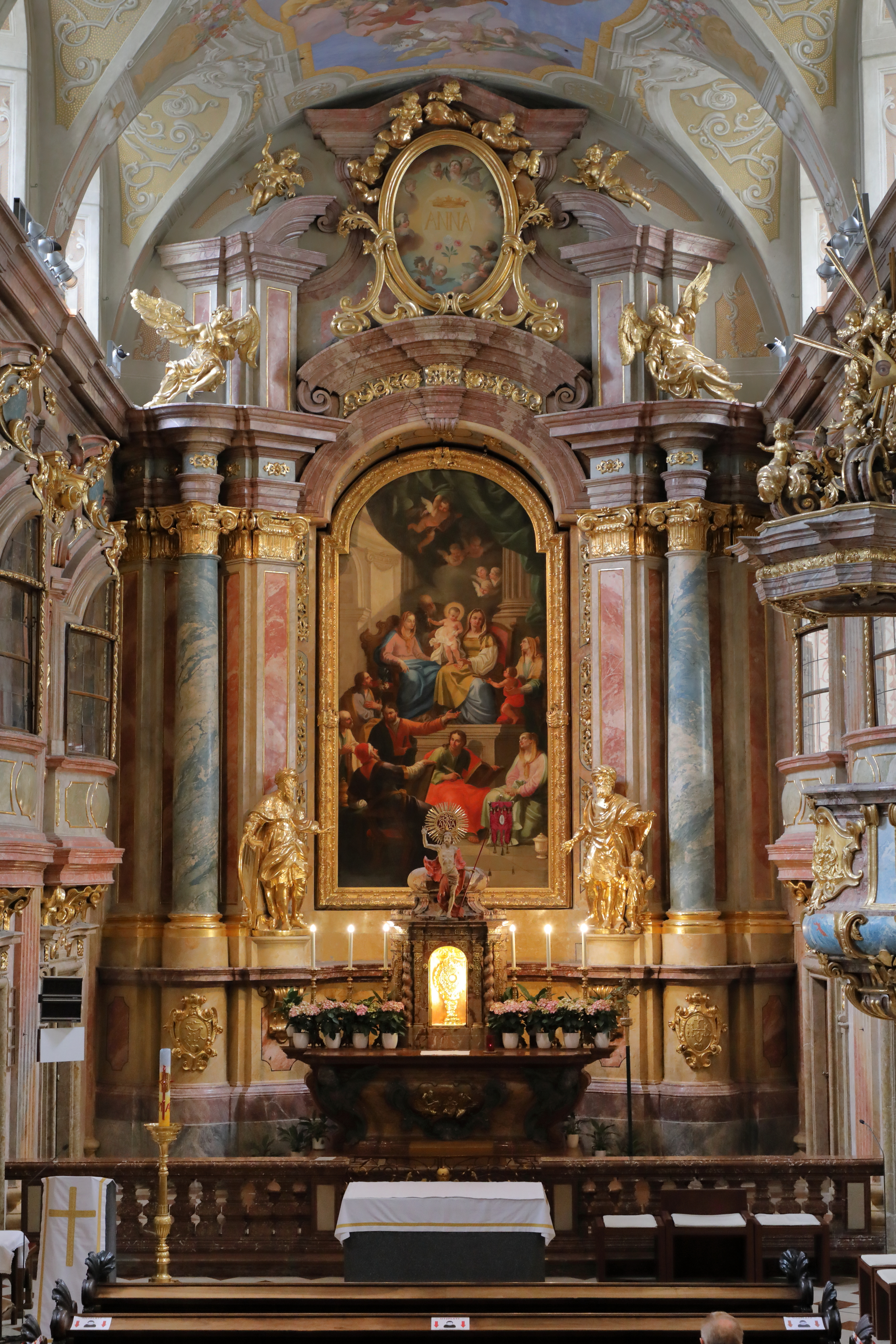
High altar based on a design by Christoph Tausch

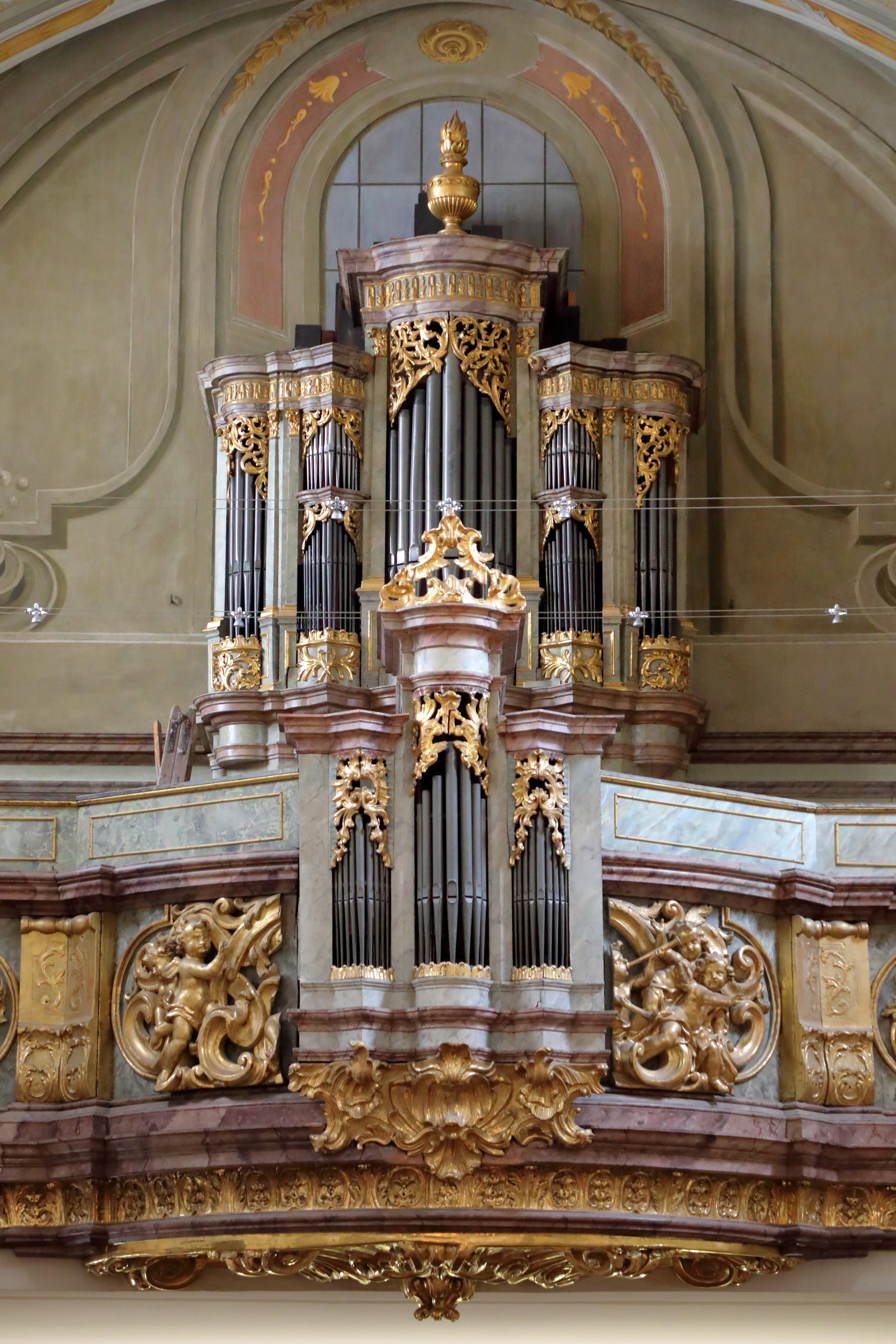
Organ by Johann Hencke

== See also ==
- List of Jesuit sites
