= Mönchsberg =

Mountain in the city of Salzburg

Coordinates: 47°48′N 13°03′E

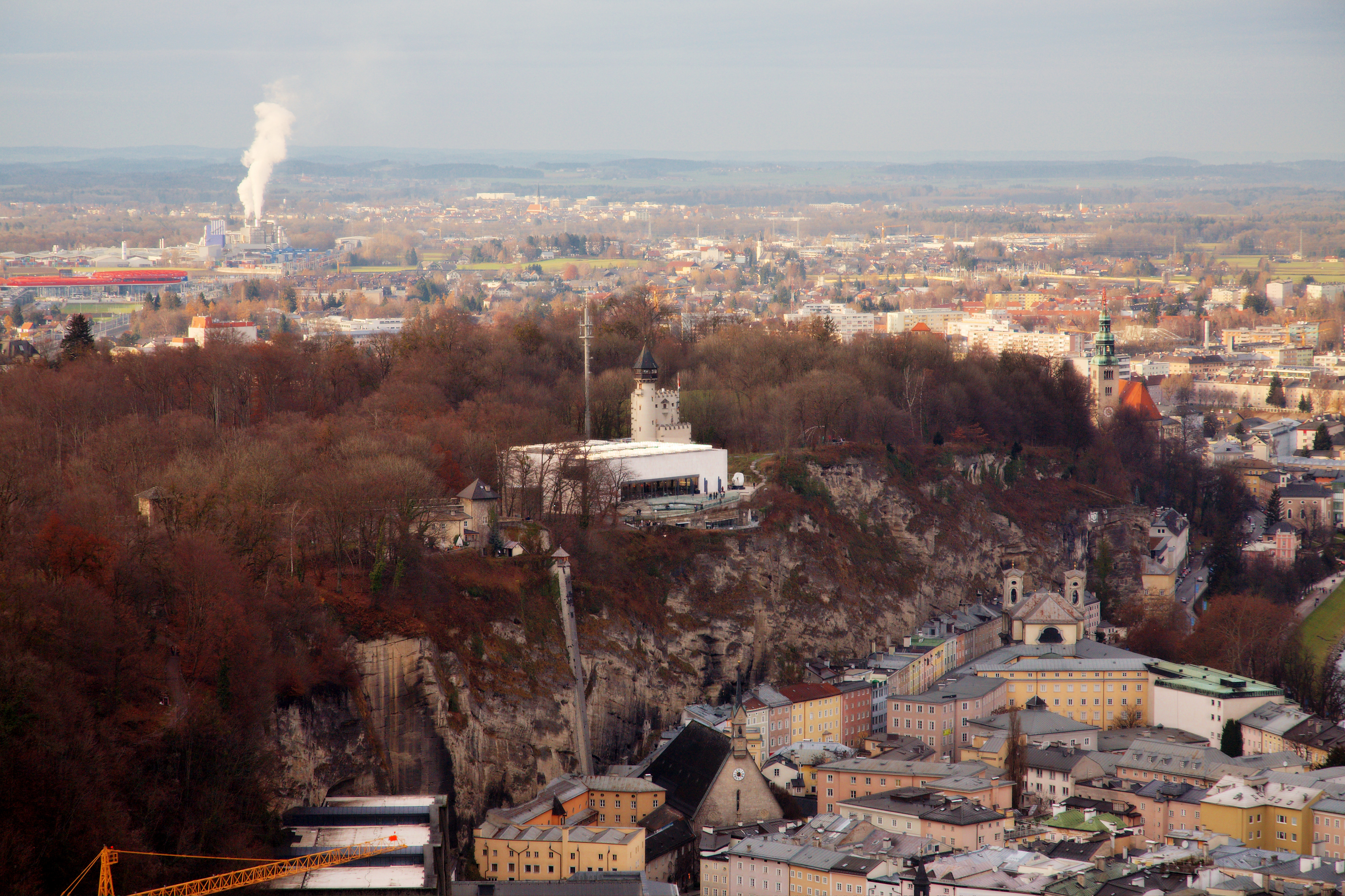
View from Hohensalzburg Fortress

The Mönchsberg (Austrian German pronunciation: [ˈmœnçsbɛrɡ]), at 508 metres (1,667 ft) above sea level, is one of five mountains in the city of Salzburg in Austria. It flanks the western side of Salzburg's historic city centre, and forms part of the city's UNESCO World Heritage Site.

It is named after the Benedictine monks of St Peter's Abbey at the northern foot of the mountain.

== Geology ==
The Mönchsberg shapes Salzburg's historic townscape with its long drawn back consisting of conglomerate (Nagelfluh). The massif is a solidified river crushed stone, deposed as a delta into the interglacial see (Mindel-Riss Interglacial), which was not cleared away thereafter by the glaciers protected from the hard limestone of the adjacent Festungsberg and so remained.

Water ingressing into numerous bursts and cleavages can lead to falling stones and demolition of whole rock sections: in the early morning of 16 July 1669 tons of rock fell off the mountain onto the Gstättengasse street below, killing about 230 citizens in their sleep and destroying two churches, a seminary and 13 houses. Since then the office of a Bergputzer (mountain inspector) has existed, filled by mountaineers who since 1778 annually dispose of loose rocks on a regular basis, and examine the condition of the mountain surface. Thus new disasters are prevented.

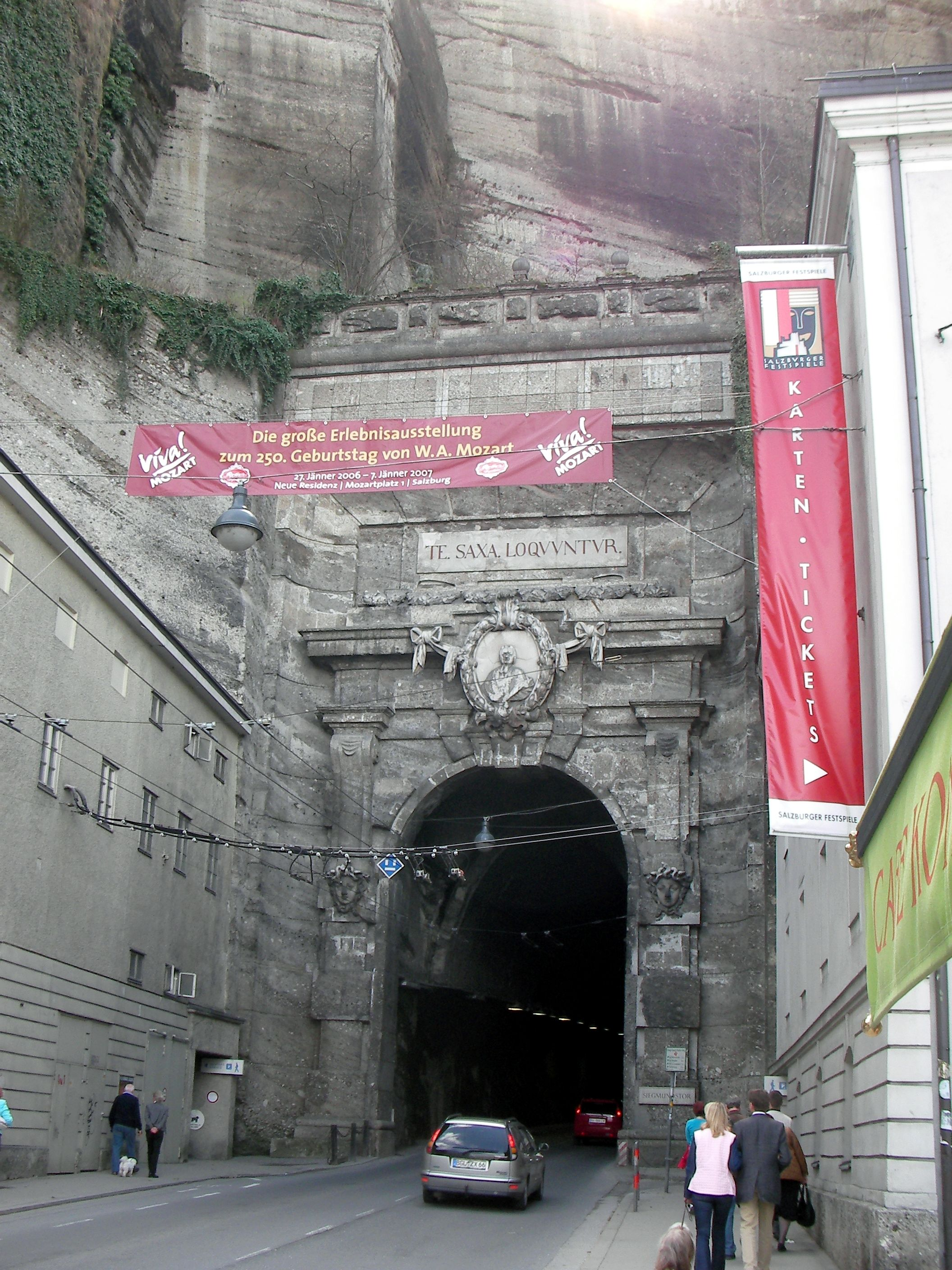
Sigmundstor, eastern entrance

== History ==
Driven into the walls of rock above of the St Peter's Cemetery, established about 700, are Early Christian hermitages, called Katakomben (catacombs), which however never were funeral places.

Between 1137 and 1143, the Archbishop of Salzburg had the Stiftsarm branch of the Almkanal tunnelled through the mountain, in order to lead the waters into the city. This early adit system can be visited during the annual Almabkehr in September.

The Sigmundstor (colloquially Neutor) city gate, a 131-metre (430 ft) long tunnel with elaborate Baroque portals, was built from 1764 to 1766 through the mountain at the behest of Archbishop Sigismund von Schrattenbach; it is today one of the oldest street tunnels in Central Europe.

Large air-raid shelters in the mountain were built during World War II. After 1970 some of these were enlarged to an underground car park for more than 1400 vehicles.

== Mönchsberg today ==
The Mönchsberg plateau offers a small-scale change of forests and meadows and therefore is a popular local recreation area for the Salzburg citizens and tourists. Castles on the Mönchsberg include:

- The Johannesschlössl, rebuilt by Archbishop Wolf Dietrich Raitenau around 1590, since 1926 a guest house of the Catholic Pallotine order.
- The archiepiscopal Marketenderschlössl, also held by the Pallottines and since 1960 a study centre run by the University of Redlands, California
- Schloss Mönchstein, which had been held by the Benedictine University of Salzburg, has been a hotel since 1948.
- The Kupelwieserschlössl, where the Austrian writer Peter Handke lived from 1979 to 1988. He described a walk over the Mönchsberg in his novella Nachmittag eines Schriftstellers (“afternoon of a writer”).

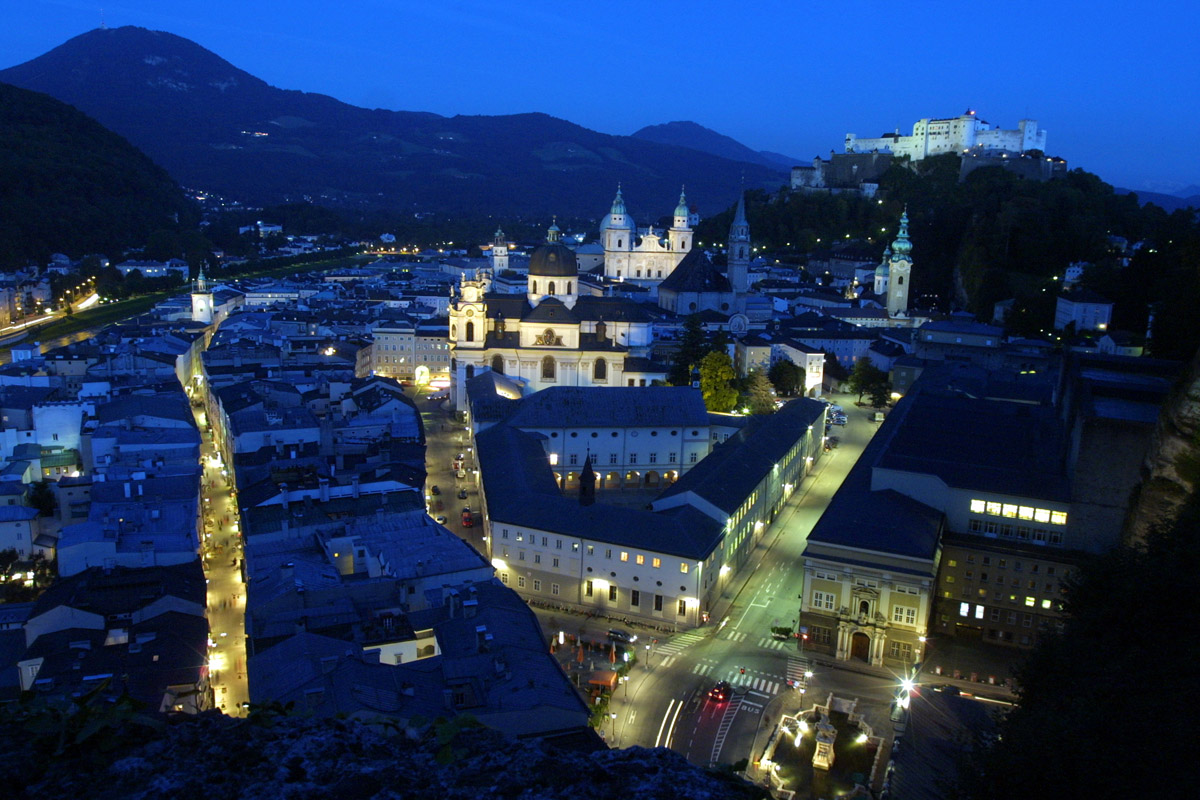
View from the Mönchsberg over the old town to Hohensalzburg

Furthermore several historic fortifications offer panoramic views over the city, to the Untersberg, the Berchtesgaden Alps and the Salzkammergut mountains:

- The Richterhöhe, which makes an excellent prospect on the south of the city and the mountain chain of the alps behind it. The fort structures are documented were first documented in 1278. Prince-archbishop Paris von Lodron strengthened it during the Thirty Years' War.
- The Bürgerwehr was established about 1487/88 with 4 towers as part of the city walls and was extended with another 4 towers after 1500.
- The Müllner Schanze with the military towers of the Augustinerpforte and Monikapforte were built by Archbishop Paris von Lodron in the years 1621 to 1644 as a three-step fortress and a part of the new city wall.
- The Humboldtterrasse, a fortification structure also erected under Paris von Lodron, offers a unique panorama toward the Salzburg old town. It was originally called Klausenkavalier and is today named after Alexander von Humboldt, who allegedly once called the areas of Salzburg, Naples and Constantinople the “most beautiful on earth”.
- The top of the Mönchsberg since 2004 is the second location of the Salzburg Museum of Modern Art. It used to be the site of the Grand Café Winkler, a popular restaurant destination, and the Salzburg Casino. Since 1890 visitors can reach the place with an elevator in the mountain. The panorama terrace adjacent to the museum is a much visited point with a view all over the old town.

Not only due to Peter Handke's stay, the Mönchsberg is frequently called the “mountain of writers”: It plays a significant role in the autobiographic work of Thomas Bernhard, but often not in the positive sense: he referred to it as "the suicide mountain". The Austrian author Gerhard Amanshauser also was among the inhabitants of the Mönchsberg. In his autobiography “as a barbarian in the Prater” the mountain and the near Festungsberg are important.

== Mountains of Salzburg ==
The other mountains in Salzburg are:

- Kapuzinerberg
- Rainberg
- Festungsberg
- Hellbrunner Berg

== Literature in German ==
- Katrin Hauer: Der Bergsturz des Mönchsbergs in der Stadt Salzburg von 1669. Wahrnehmung, Deutung und Bewältigung, in: Historische Sozialkunde, Themenheft 2/2008: Naturkatastrophen (Hg. Christian Rohr), Wien 2008, 21-31.
- Reinhard Medicus: Der Mönchsberg in Natur- und Kulturgeschichte, in: Der Gardist - Jahresschrift der Bürgergarde der Stadt Salzburg, 23. Jahrgang, 2003
- Reinhard Medicus: Die Felsen des Mönchsbergs und ihre Geschichte, in: Bastei - Zeitschrift für die Erhaltung von Bauten Kultur und Gesellschaft, 53. Jahrgang, 3. Folge, Salzburg, 2004
- Reinhard Medicus: Dreißigjähriger Krieg und Müllner Schanze - Rekonstruktion einer Wehranlage , in: Bastei - Zeitschrift für die Erhaltung von Bauten Kultur und Gesellschaft, 54. Jahrgang, 1. Folge, Salzburg, 2005
- Reinhard Medicus: Die alte Bürgerwehr am Mönchsberg und ihre Geschichte, in: Bastei - Zeitschrift für die Erhaltung von Bauten Kultur und Gesellschaft, 53. Jahrgang, 2. Folge, Salzburg, 2004
