= Festungsberg =

Mountain in Austria

Coordinates: 47°47′43″N 13°02′54″E

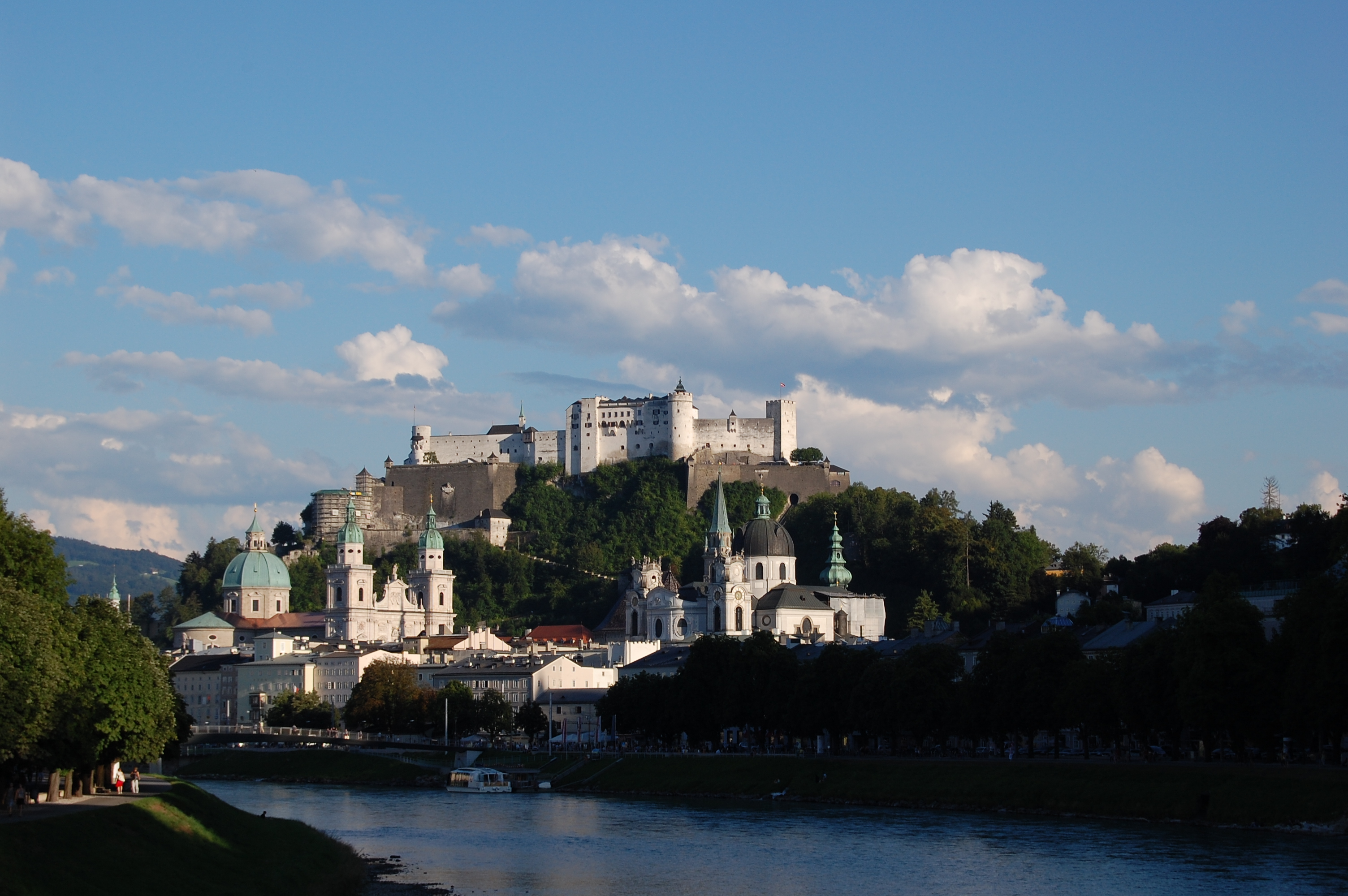
Festungsberg with Hohensalzburg Fortress, view from Salzach river

Festungsberg (Austrian German pronunciation: [ˈfɛstʊŋsbɛrɡ], lit. 'Fortress Mountain') is a mountain in the city of Salzburg in Austria, which rises to an elevation of 542 metres (1,778 ft). It is the site of the Hohensalzburg Fortress, which towers over Salzburg's historic city centre to the north, and forms part of the city's UNESCO World Heritage Site.

The Festungsberg forms the northern rim of the Berchtesgaden range within the Northern Limestone Alps.

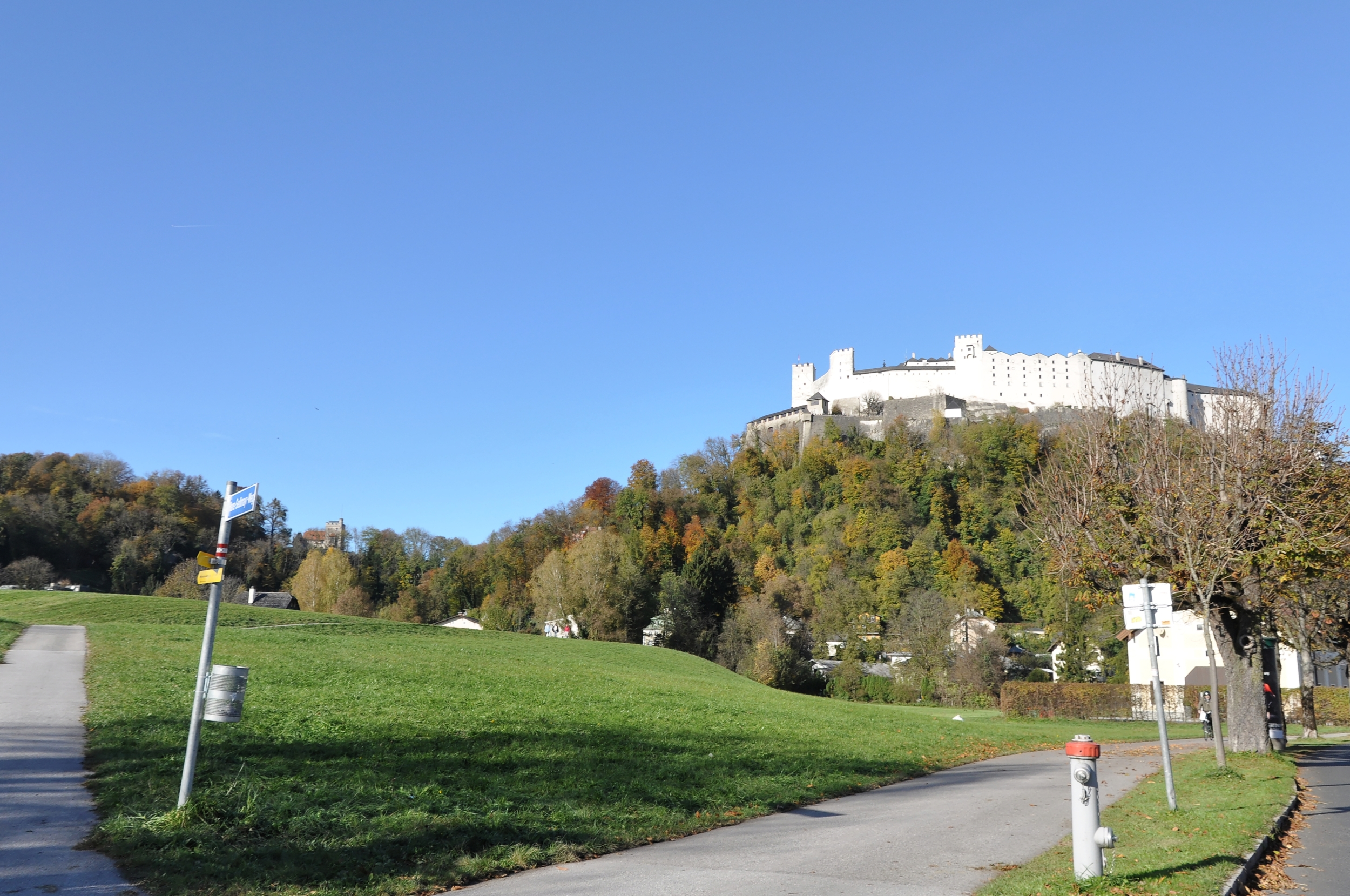
Festungsberg from the south

Archaeological findings date back to the Celtic La Tène culture. The area was fortified during the days of the Roman above the city of Iuvavum until King Odoacer of Italy commanded to leave the Province of Noricum in 488. About 715 Bishop Rupert of Salzburg established the Benedictine Nonnberg Abbey at the eastern foot of the mountain. Archbishop Gebhard had a first castle built at the top during the Investiture Controversy about 1077. Formerly used for grassland or for vineyard cultivation by the monks of St Peter's Abbey, the slopes are nowadays mostly wooded.

== See also ==
- Mönchsberg - another mountain in the city of Salzburg
