= Daniel Gran =

Austrian painter (1694–1757)

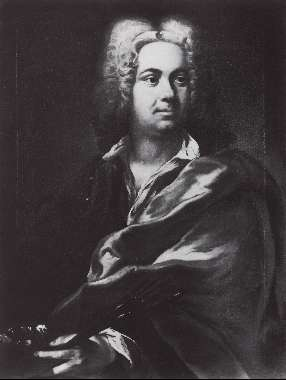
- Born: 22 May 1694; Vienna
- Died: 16 April 1757 (aged 62); Sankt Pölten
- Education: Sebastiano Ricci (Venice, Italy) and Francesco Solimena (Naples, Italy)
- Known for: Painting
- Notable work: St Anna's Church's frescoes (Vienna), Österreichische Nationalbibliothek Prunksaal's frescoes
- Movement: Baroque

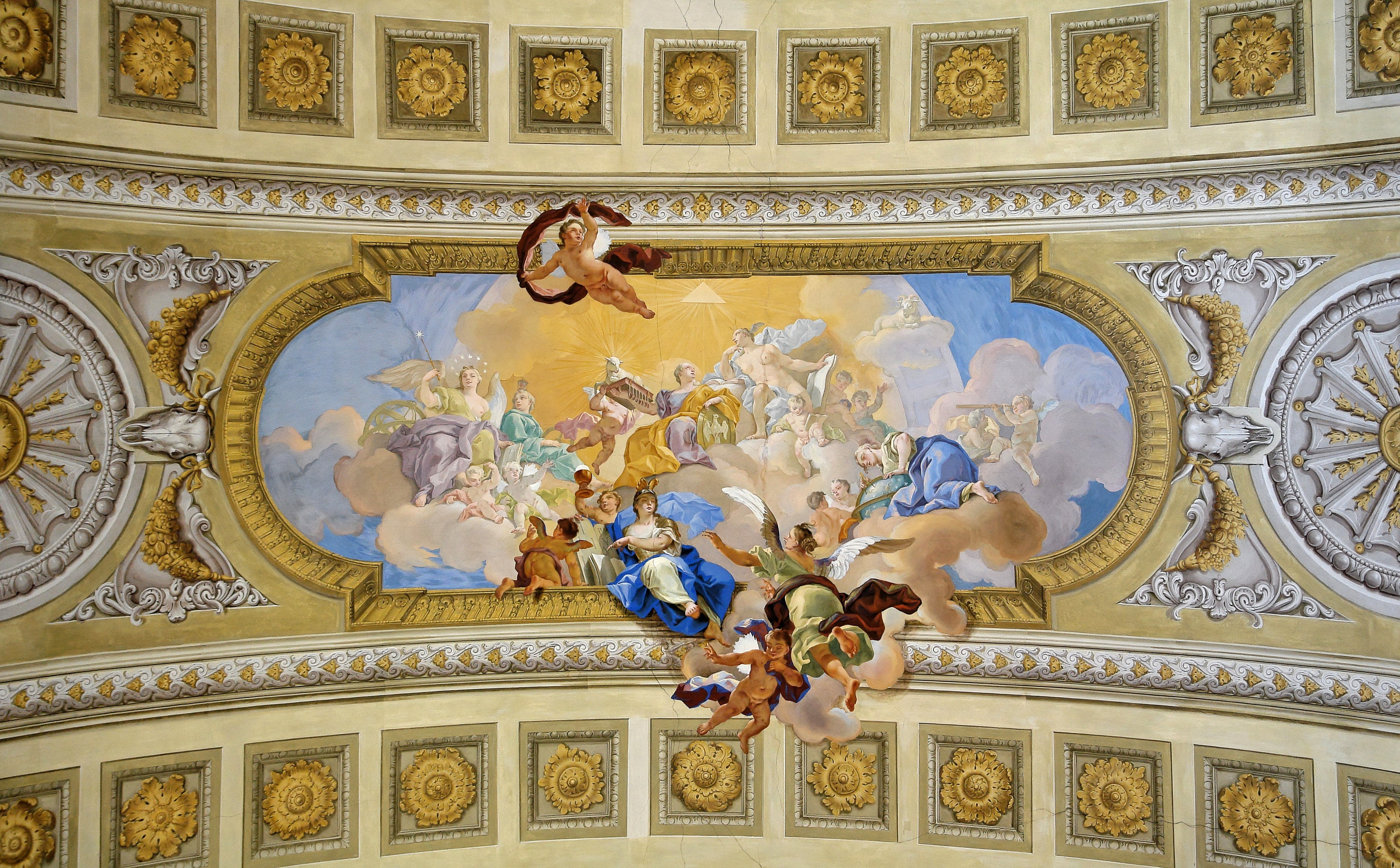
Prunksaal: allegory of peace and heaven. Ceiling painting made by Daniel Gran (1694-1757) finished in 1730.

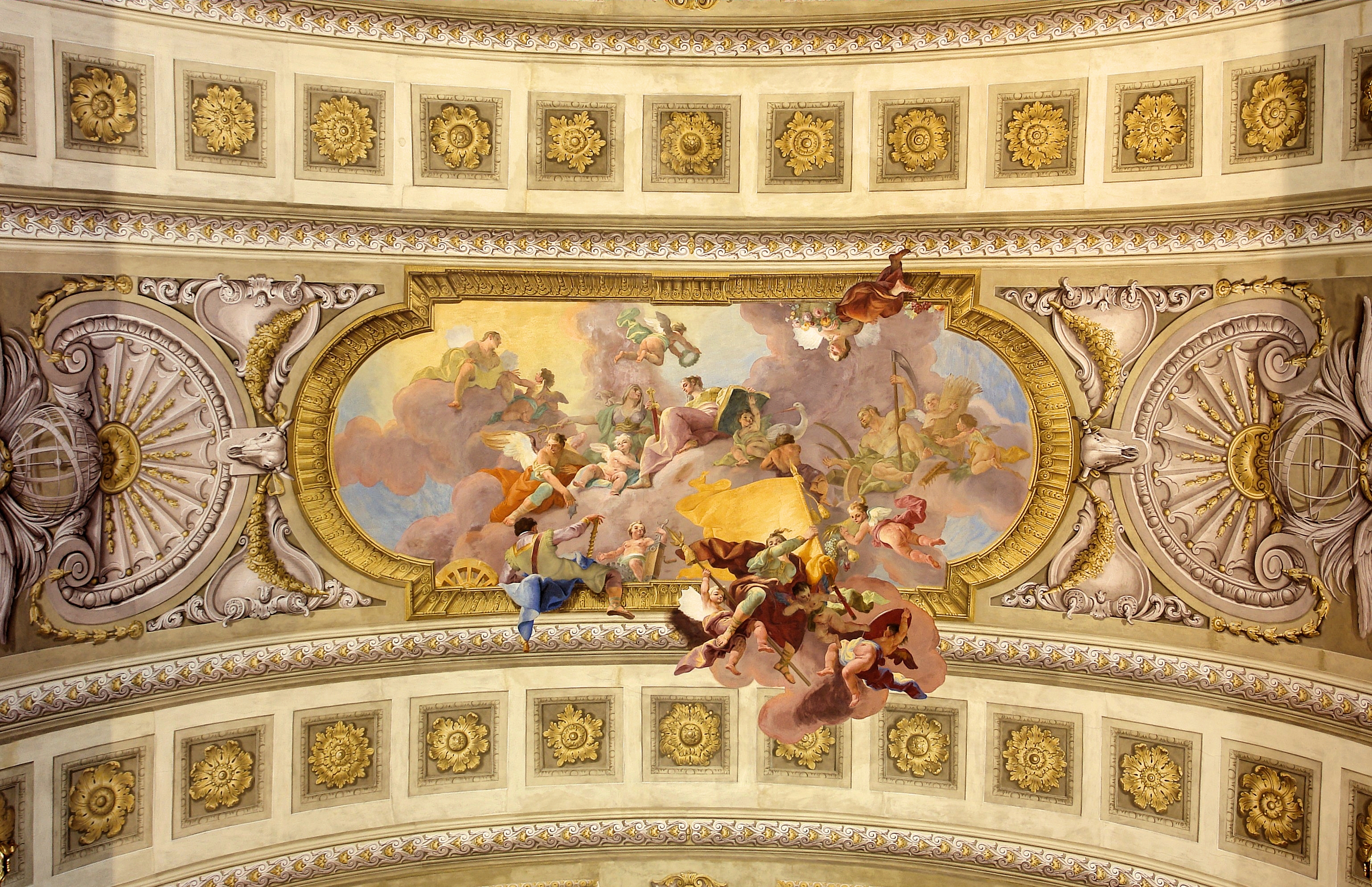
Prunksaal: allegory of war and law. Ceiling painting made by Daniel Gran (1694-1757) finished in 1730.

Daniel Gran (22 May 1694 – 16 April 1757) was an Austrian painter. His pictures ornament several public buildings in his native city. He was of some consideration in his time and after a century of Italian dominance one of the first important painters of the German-speaking countries, but his works are relatively unknown outside of Austria and Germany today.

== Life and education ==
Gran was one of the sons of Hofkochs Kaiser Leopold I. He was sponsored by the House of Schwarzenberg, which helped finance his studies and travels in Italy, where he studied primarily with Sebastiano Ricci in Venice and Francesco Solimena in Naples. His works can be noted for a wavering between Venetian influence in coloring and Neapolitan influence in composition. In addition to the Princely House of Schwarzenberg, he also painted for the House of Habsburg; 1727 he was appointed court painter.

From 1732, he used the title "Daniel le Grand," and from 1736, with the predicate "della Torre." In the absence of documentation, the verifiability of his nobility in the Registry of Vienna Gratialarchivs is doubtful. More accurate is the master title and coat of arms of an imperial Fähnrich, Nikolaus Gran della Torre (ennobled on 12 May 1621) which successfully laid his claim and revived his title. A wrongful use of noble titles and predicates would have been unthinkable in the time and exposed the social position of the artist.

Towards the end of his career, his paintings appear increasingly less "Baroque" (in figural dimensions, illusionism). Gran therefore can be seen as an important precursor of classicism.

In 1894, in Vienna's Rudolfsheim-Fünfhaus (15th District), the Grangasse street was named after him.

== Works ==
Frescoes

- Palais Schwarzenberg (Vienna)
- Prunksaal of the Österreichische Nationalbibliothek (formerly Hofbibliothek) (Vienna)
- Eckartsau castle
- Pilgrimage church Sonntagberg
- cathedral in Sankt Pölten
- Kaisersaal in Stift Klosterneuburg
- Neues Rathaus and Landhaussaal in Brno

Altar paintings

- Churches in the Stift Herzogenburg and Stift Lilienfeld
- Parish Church of Hirschstetten
- Cathedral in Sankt Pölten
- St Anna's church (Vienna)

Self-portrait in the monastery of Herzogenburg.

== Gallery ==
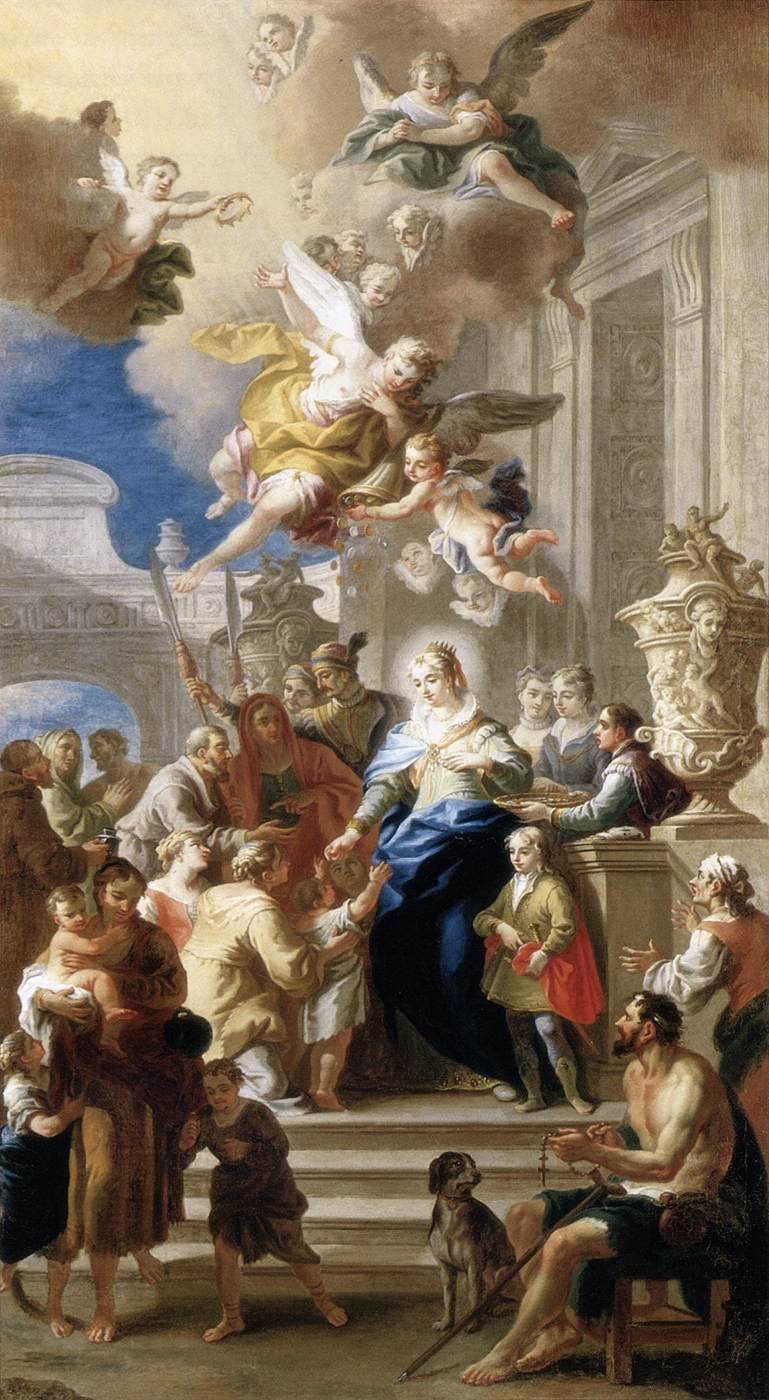
St. Elizabeth Distributing Alms, 1736

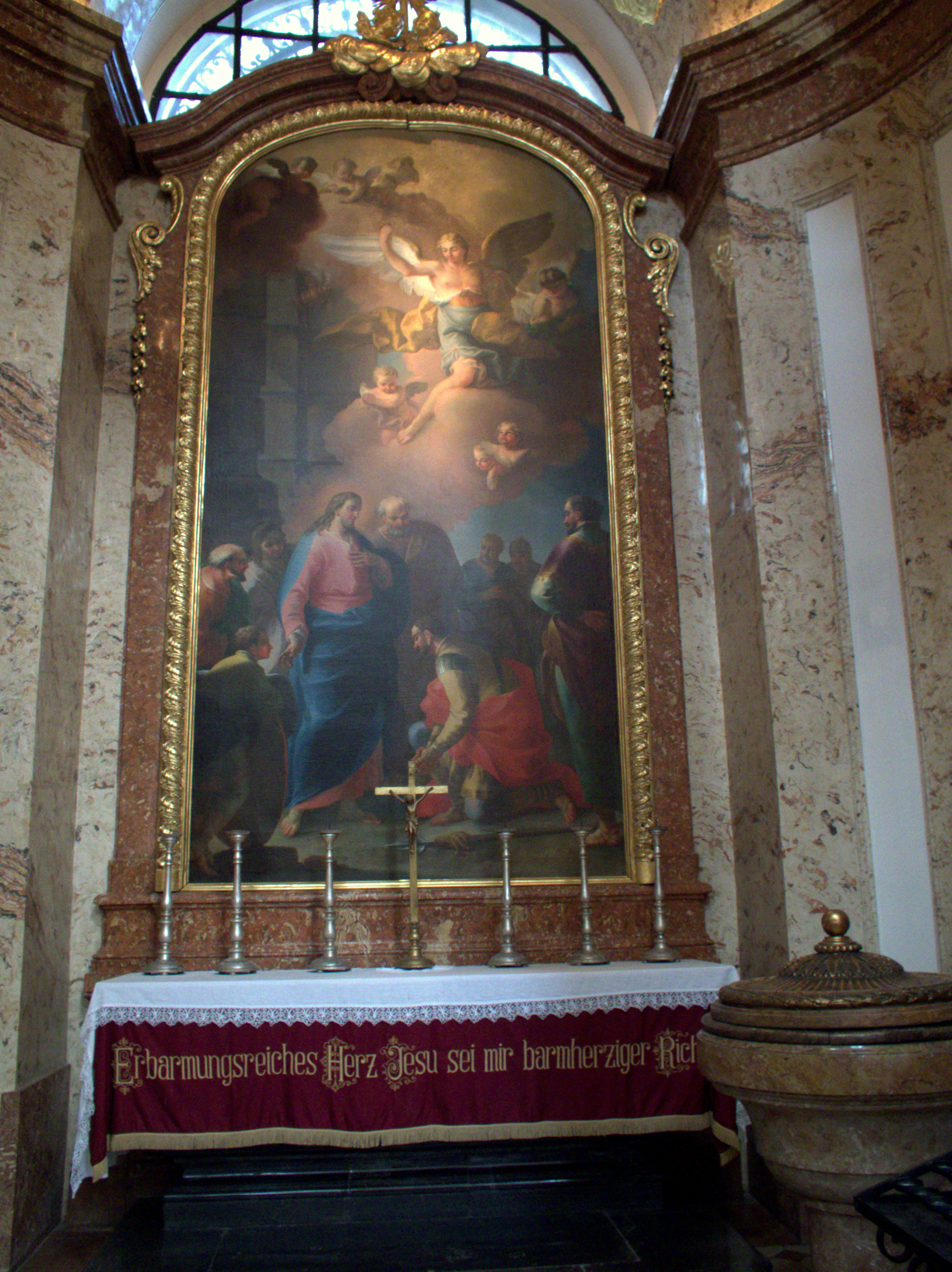
Christ and the Roman Captain, 1736

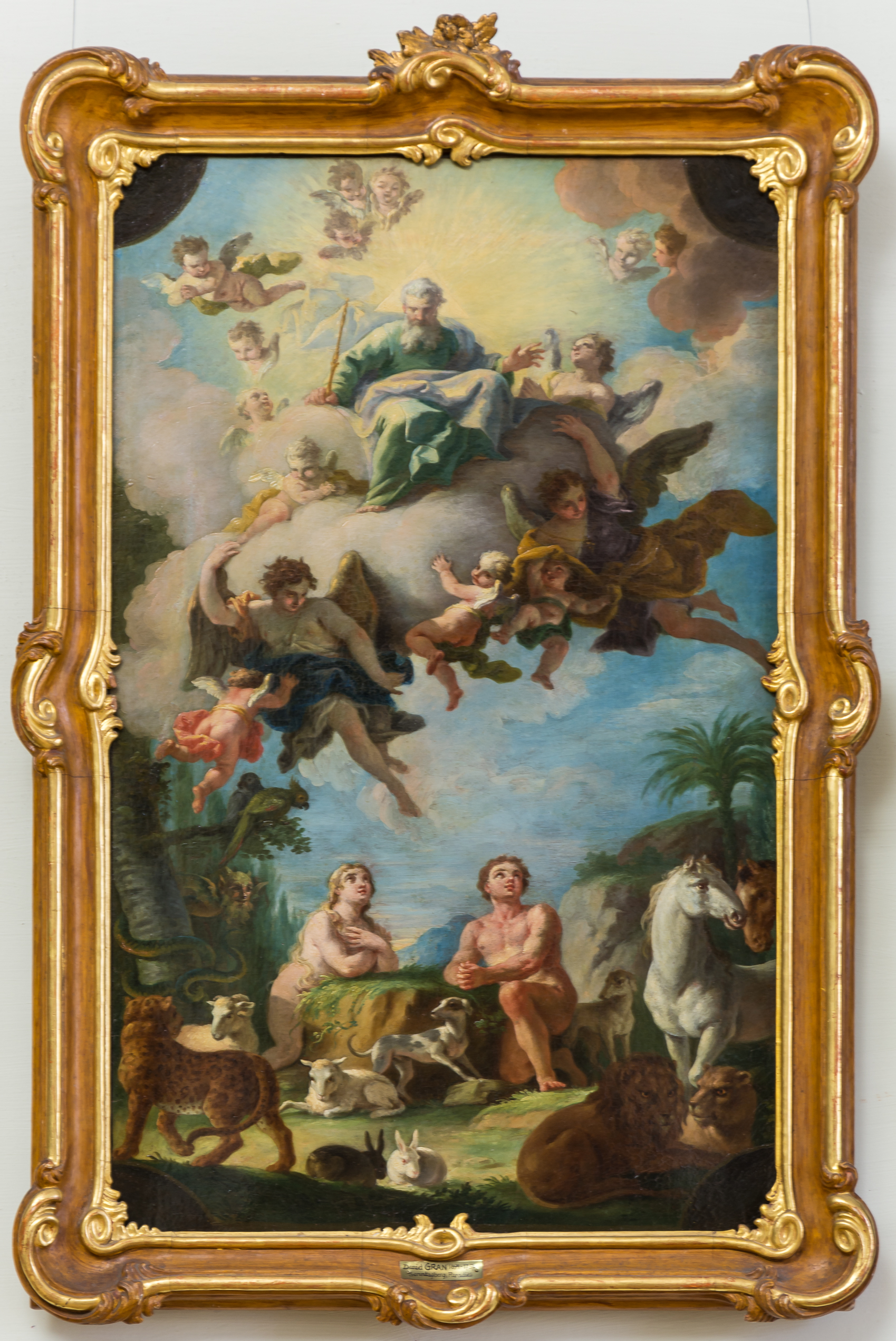
Paradise (sketch for a ceiling fresco in Sonntagberg basilica, Austria), 1736

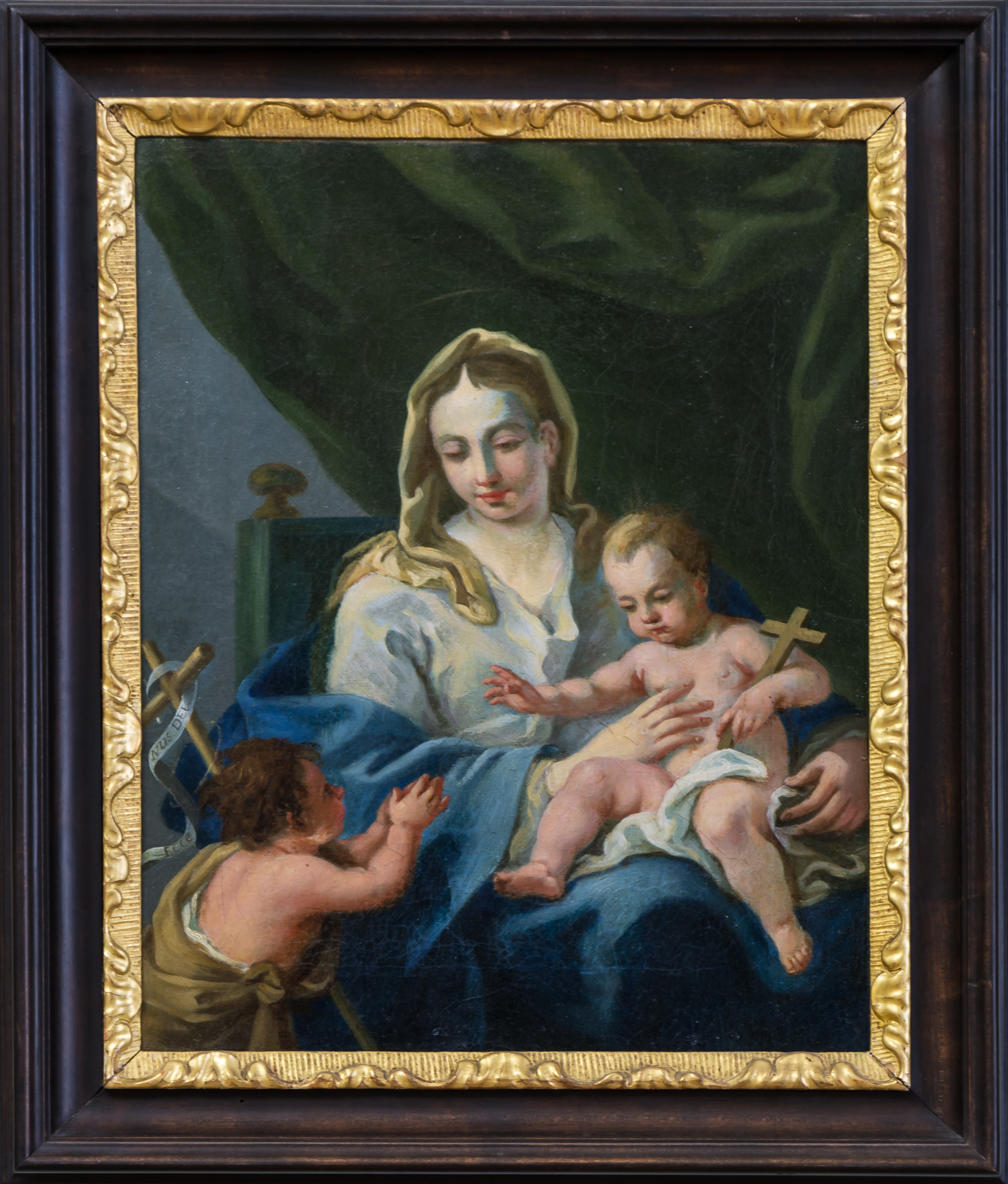
Mary with Jesus and John, 1745

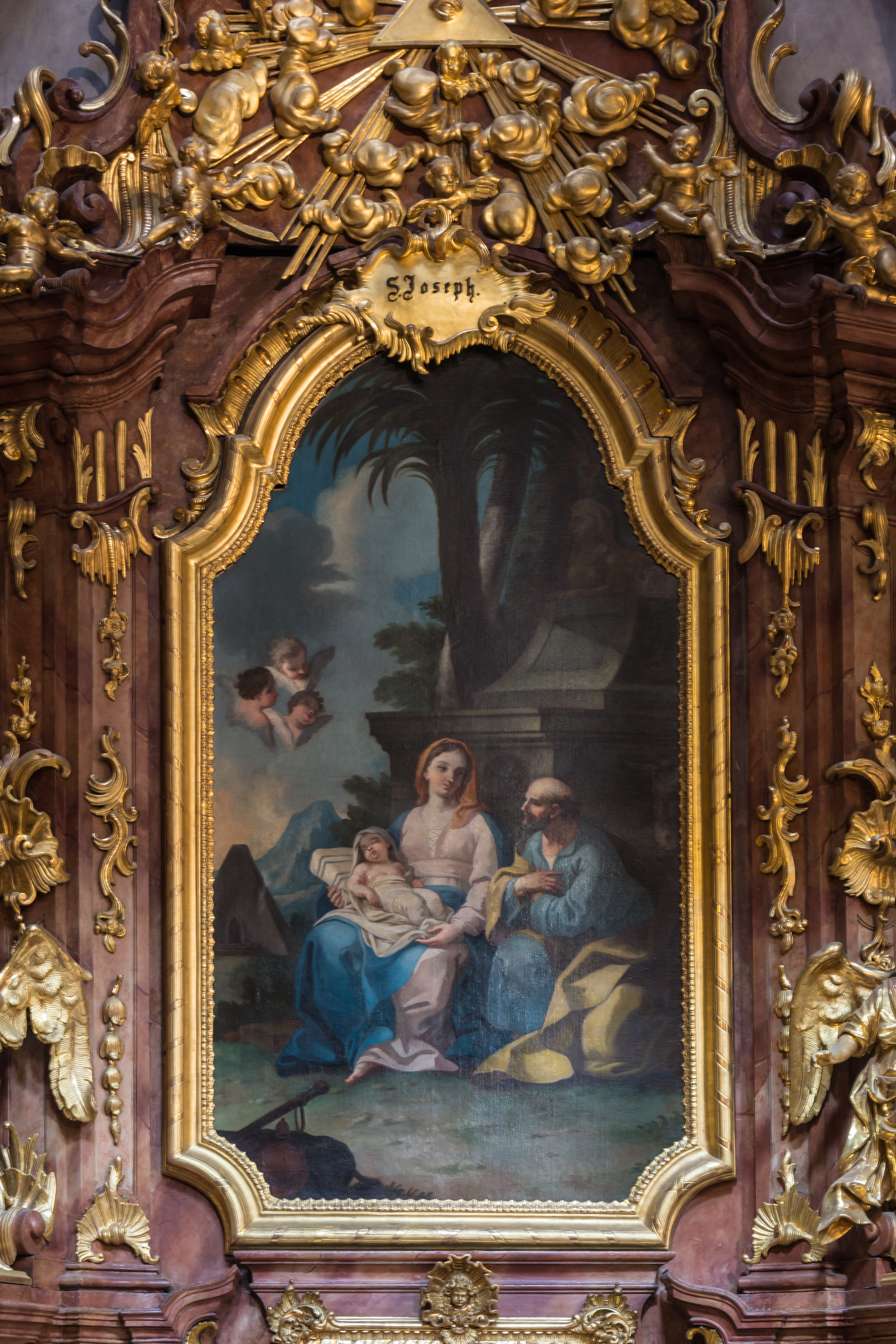
Rest on the Flight to Egypt, 1746

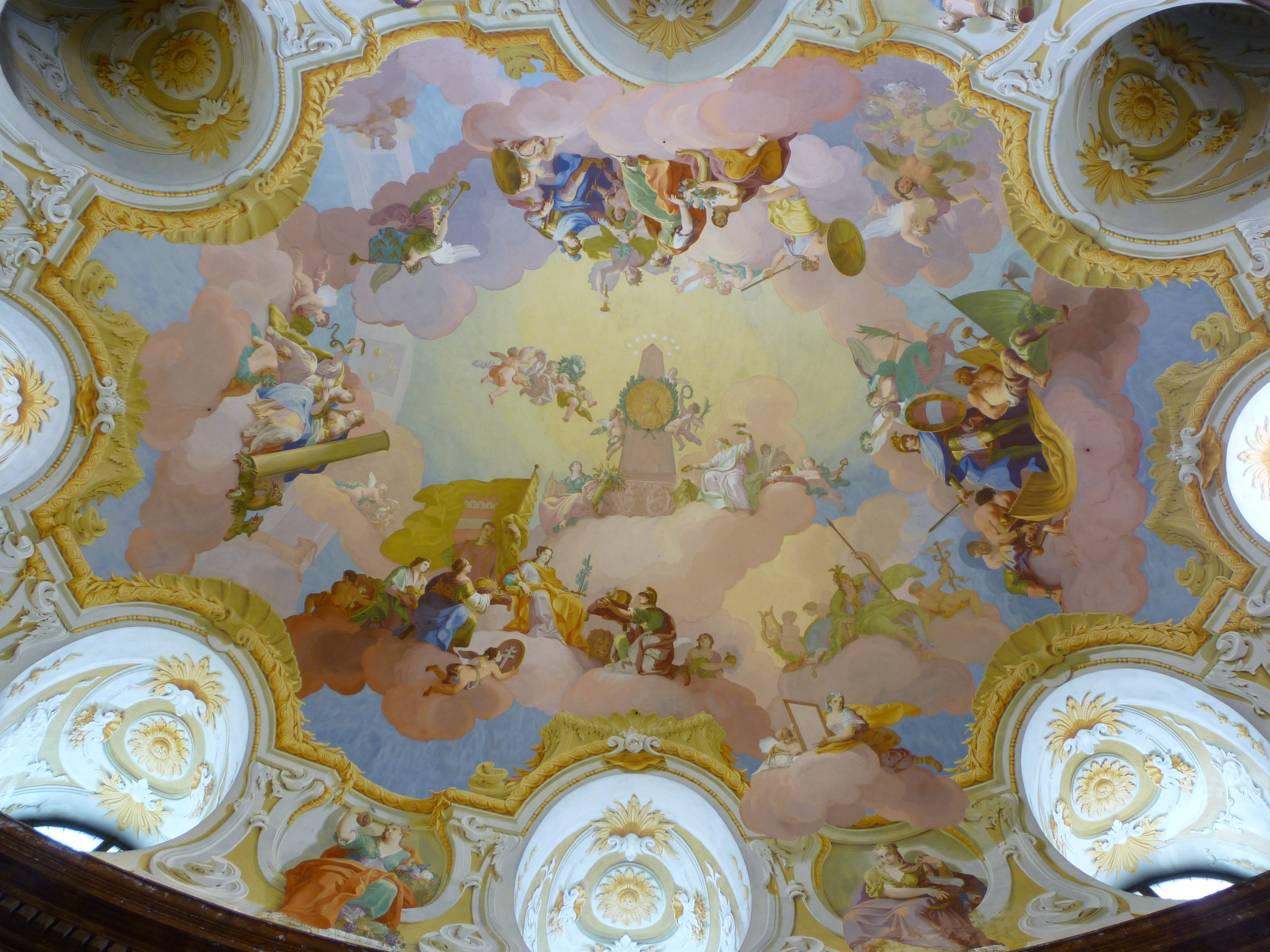
Glory of the House of Austria, Ceiling fresco in marble hall of Klosterneuburg Monastery (1749)

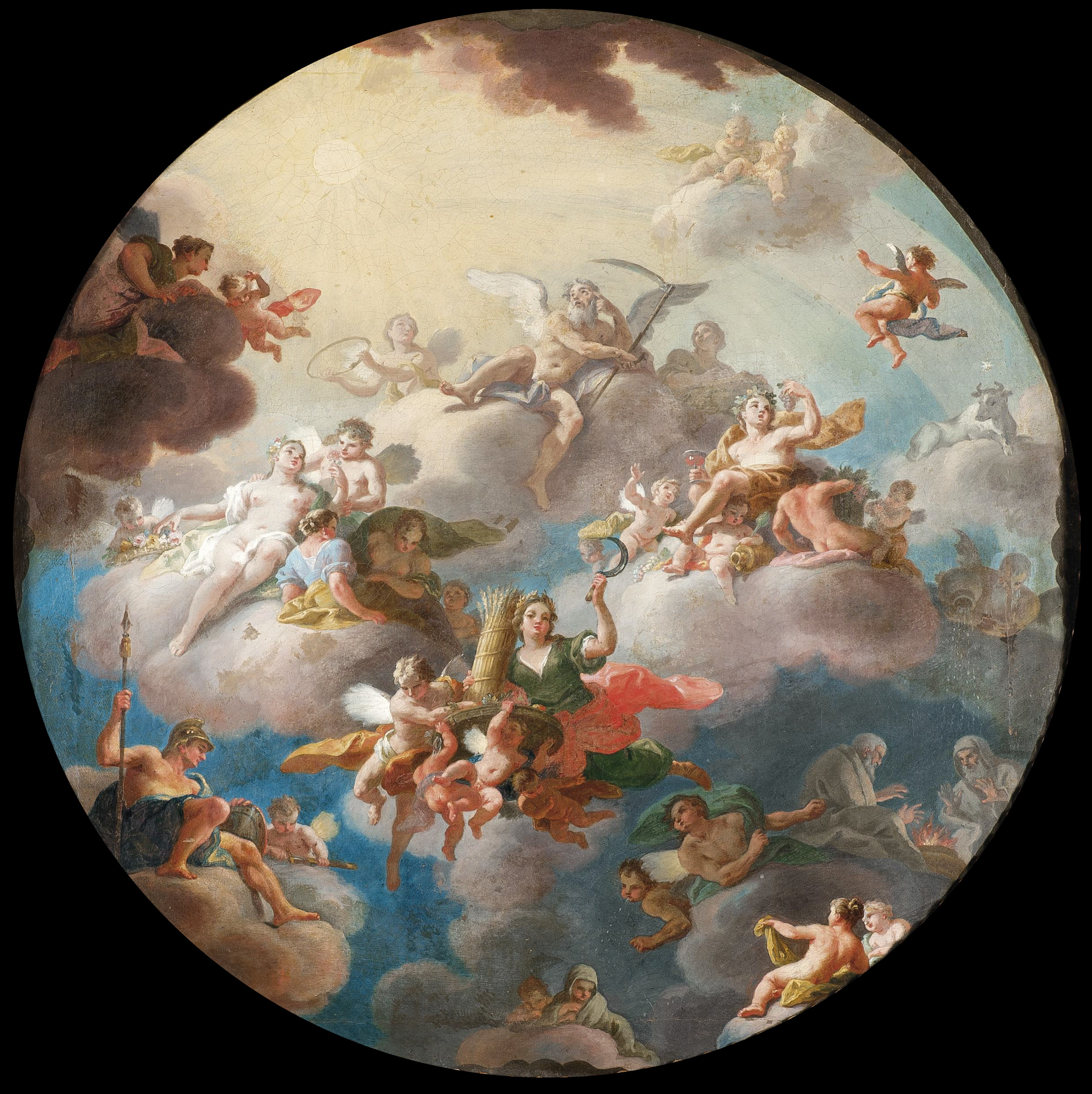
Allegory of Four Seasons, 1757

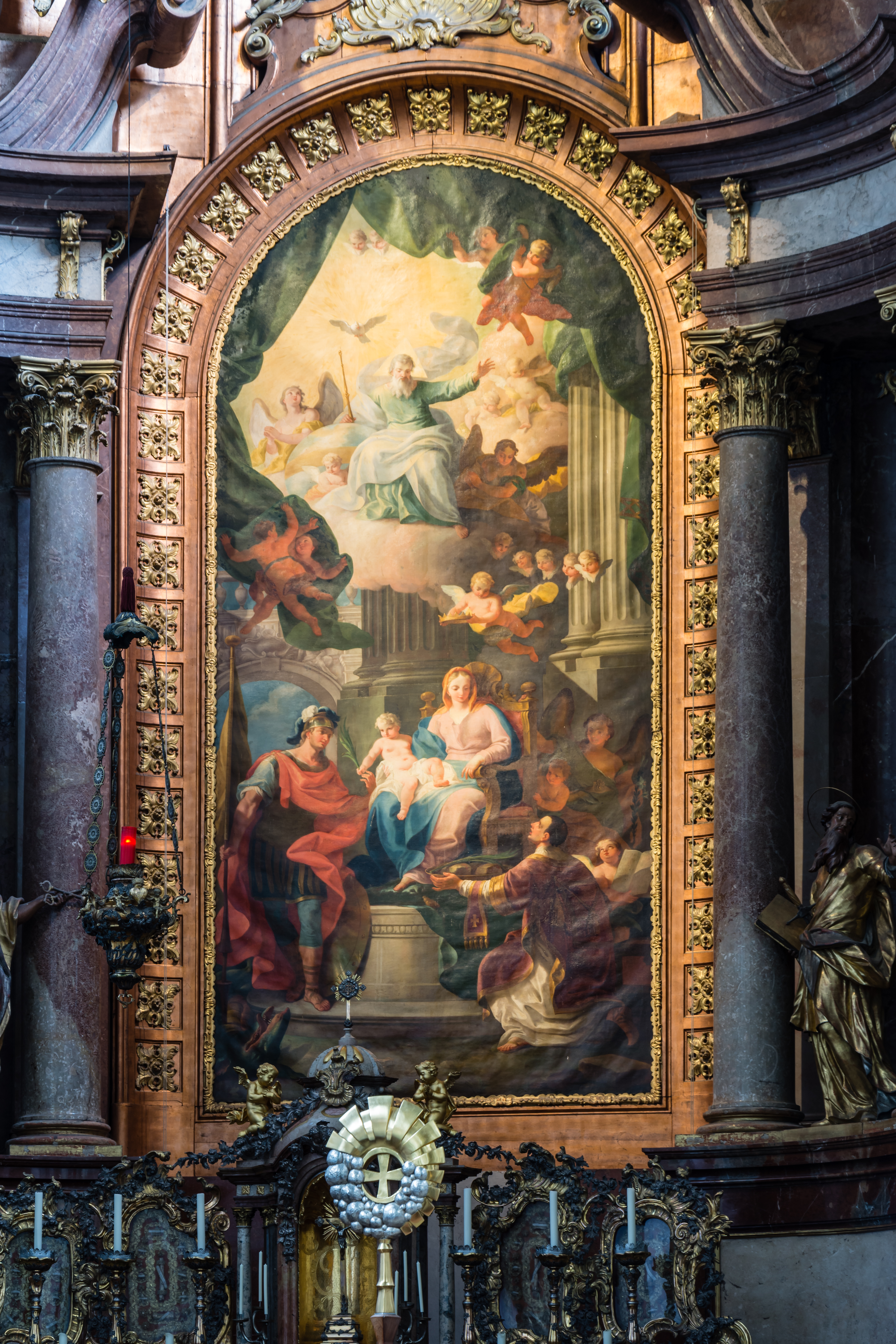
Madonna and Child with the St. George and St. Stephen

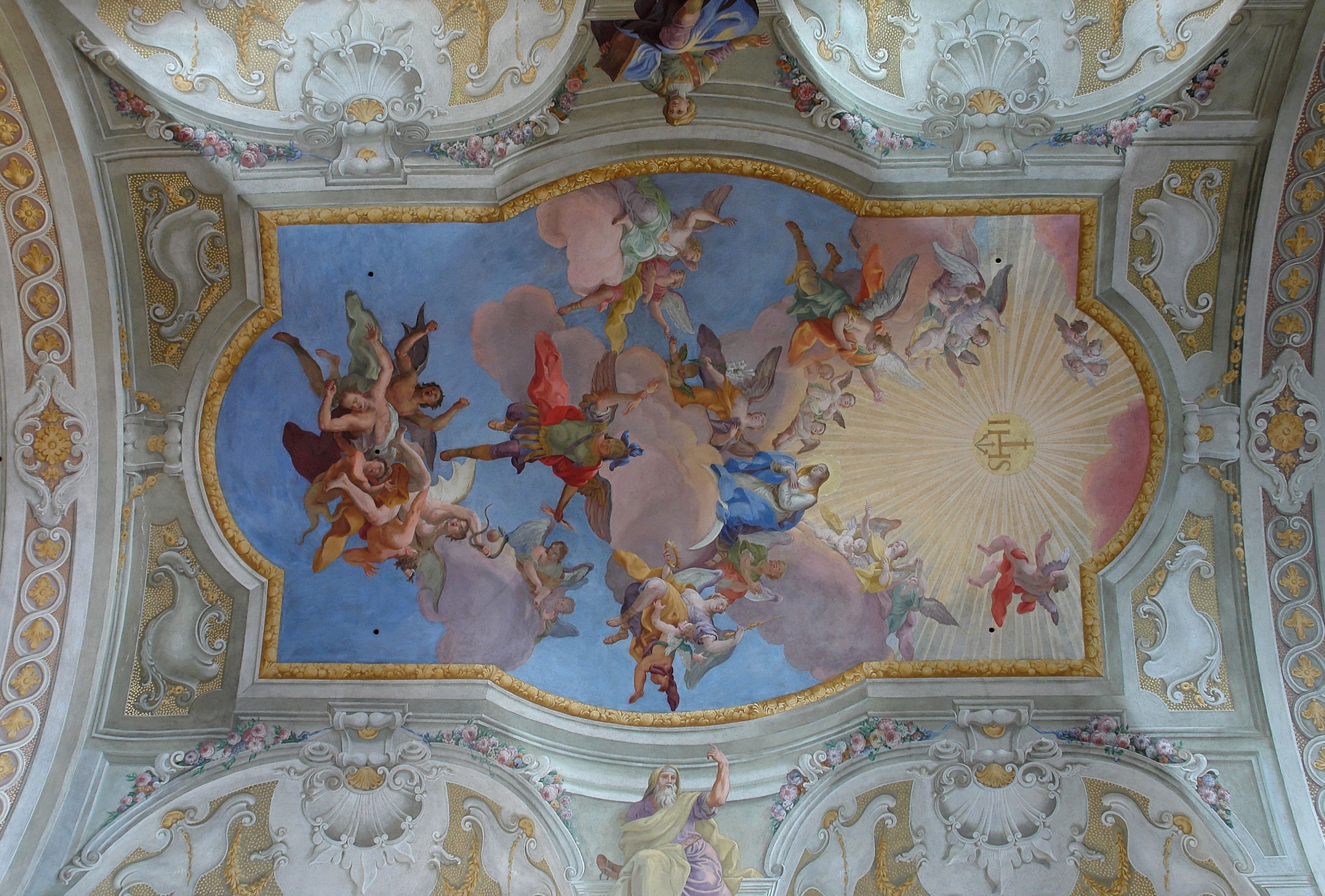
Glory of Virgin Mary

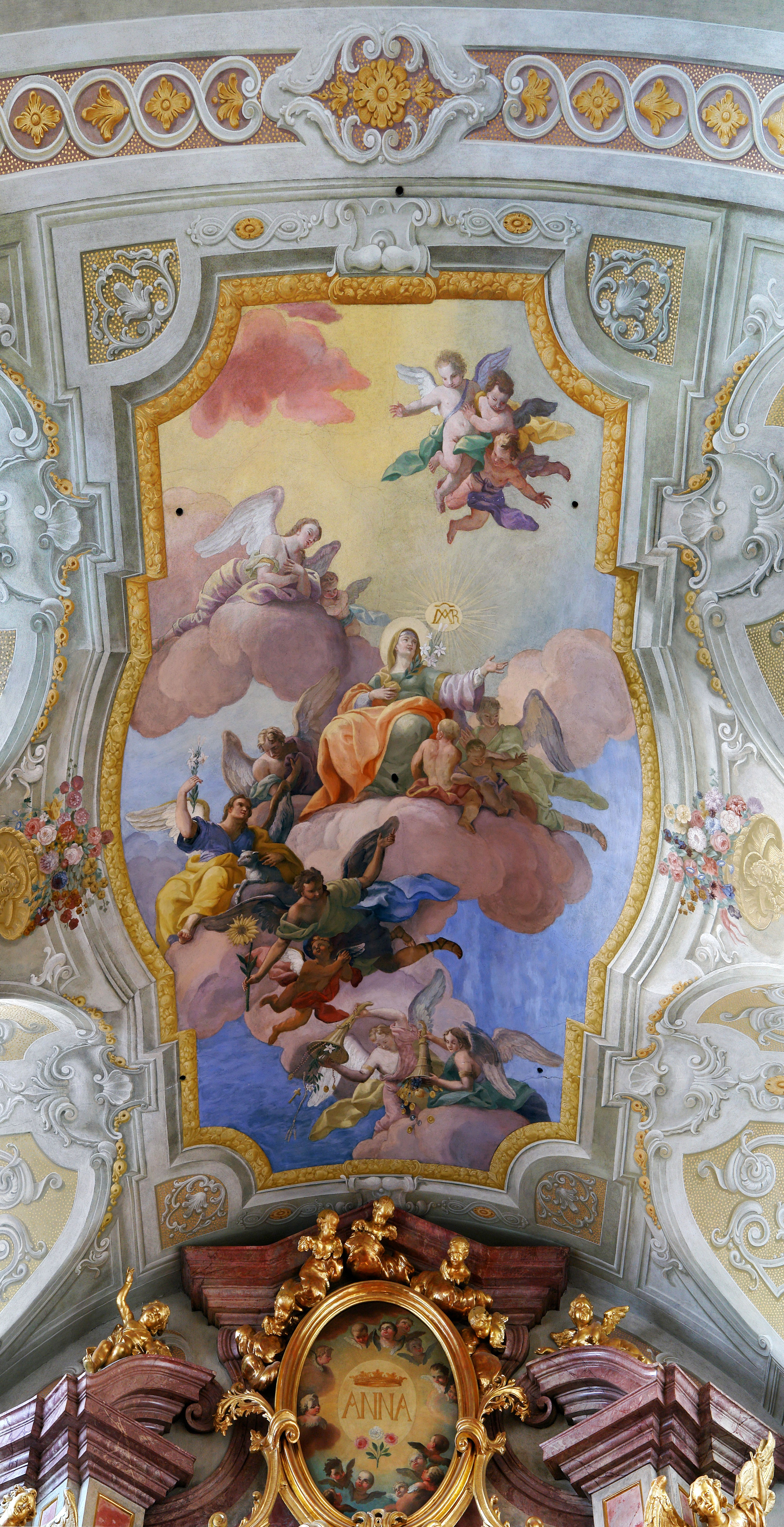
St. Anne in St. Anne's Church, Vienna

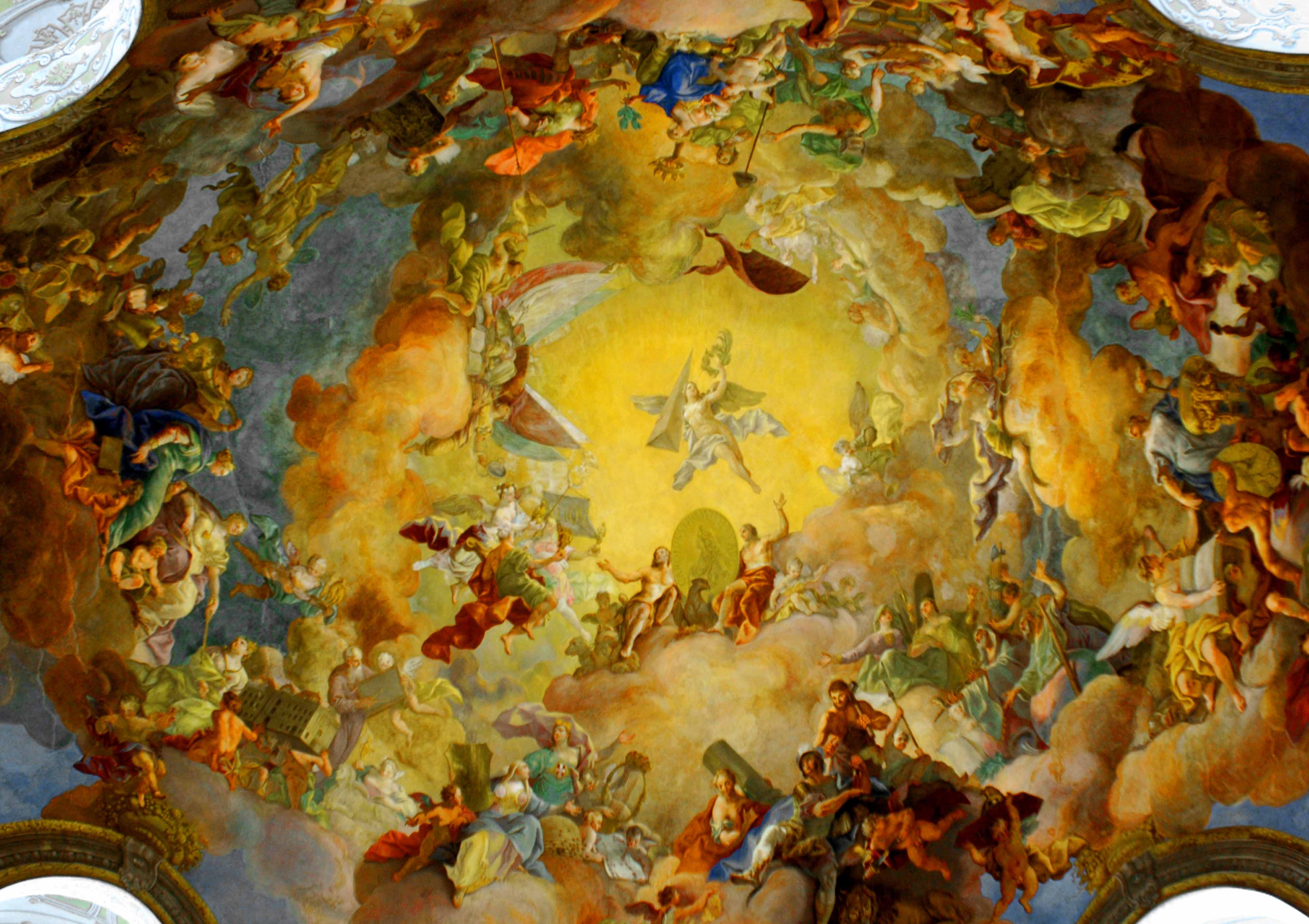
Ceiling fresco of the State Hall dome
