= Hellbrunner Berg =

Coordinates: 47°45′34″N 13°03′59″E

Hellbrunner Berg is a 515-meter-tall mountain in Salzburg, Salzburgerland, Austria.

== Location ==
It's located to the south of the Altstadt or Old City and close to the Schloss Hellbrunn, and a stone theater can be found there.

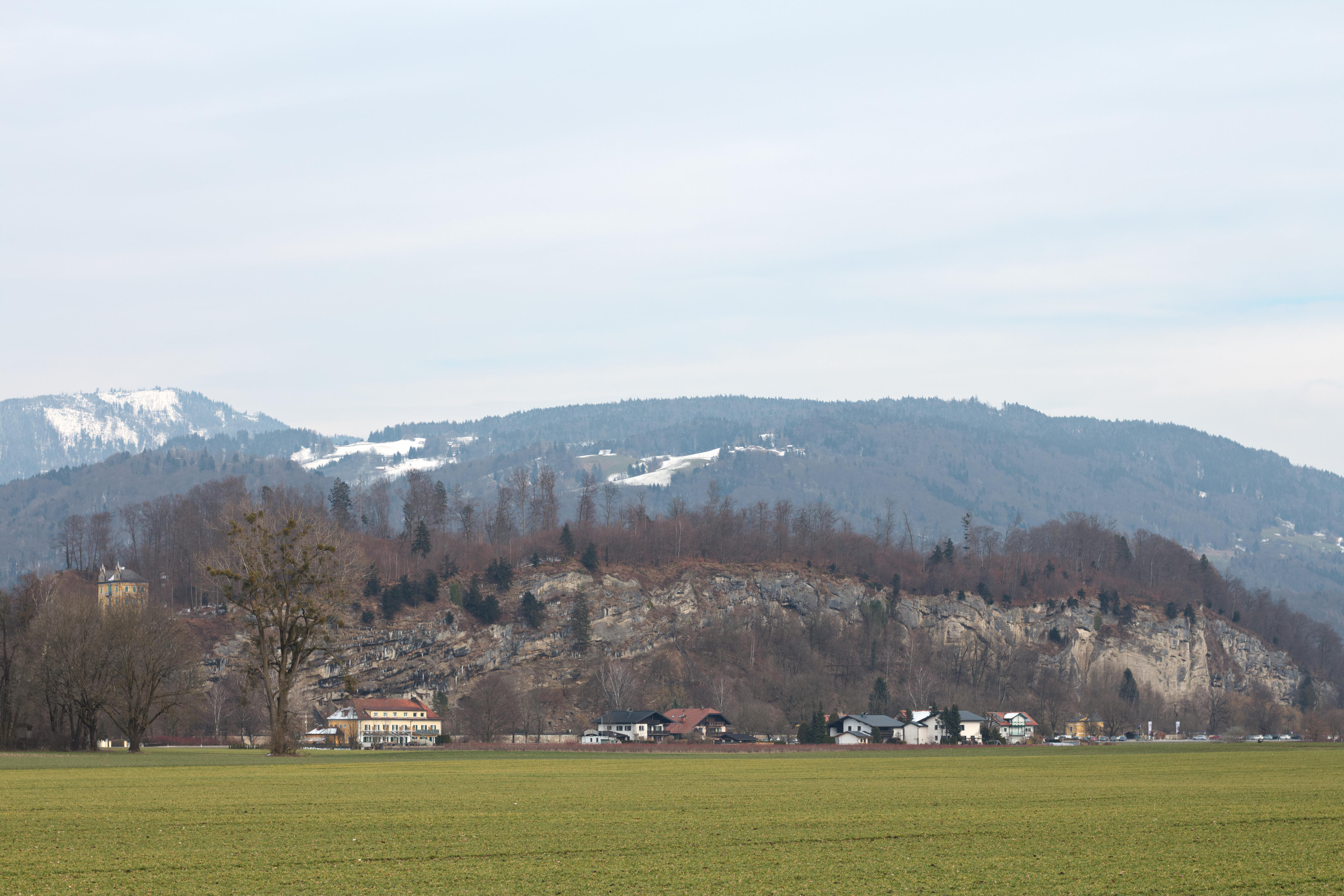

== See also ==
- Salzburg
- Salzburgerland
