= Martin Johann Schmidt =

Austrian painter

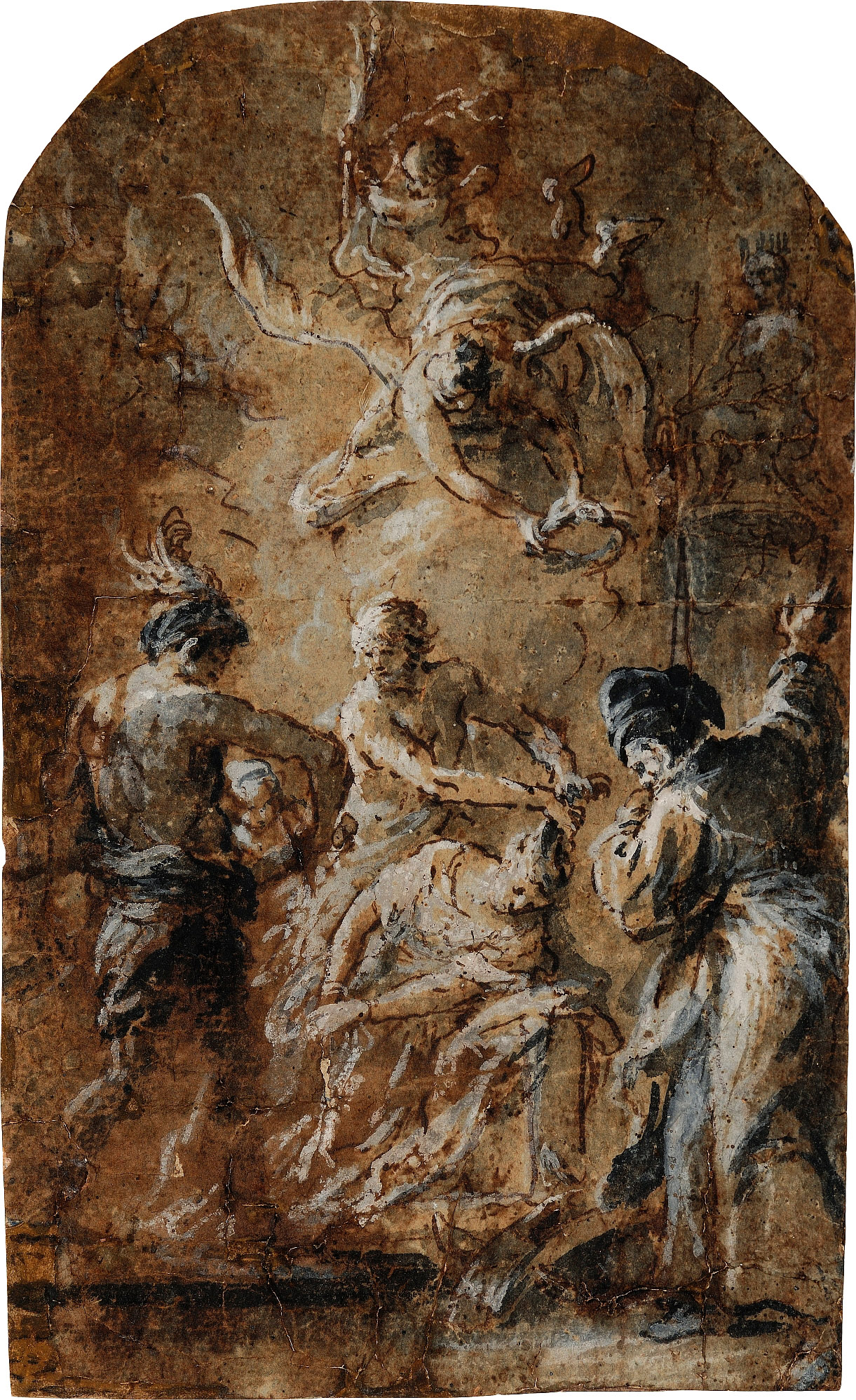
Characteristic late work in which all detail dissolves in uncountable specks of pigment in a seemingly random way: "The Beheading of Saint Catherine", 1791, study for an altar painting for Brno Cathedral that came not to be executed. Feuchtmüller (1989), catalogue raisonné No. 945

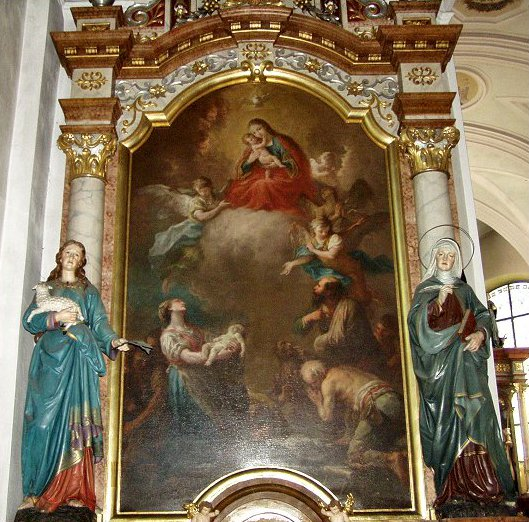
The Virgin (1755), main altar of the parish church of Waizenkirchen (Upper Austria)

Martin Johann Schmidt, called Kremser Schmidt or Kremserschmidt, (25 September 1718 – 28 June 1801), was one of the outstanding Austrian painters of the late Baroque/Rococo along with Franz Anton Maulbertsch.

He was born at Grafenwörth, Lower Austria, a son of the sculptor Johannes Schmidt. A pupil of Gottlieb Starmayr, he spent most of his life at Stein, where he mostly worked in the numerous churches and monasteries of his Lower Austrian homeland. While the evolution of his style after 1750 shows that he had either spent a formative period in northern Italy or had at least had extensive contact with northern Italian works of art prior to that date, his works are also clearly influenced by Rembrandt (visible above all in his etchings) and the great fresco-painters of the Austrian Baroque, Paul Troger and Daniel Gran.

Despite not having received formal academic training, in 1768 he was made a member of the imperial academy at Vienna due to his artistic merits, which by that time had already been recognized by a wider public inside and outside of Austria.

Primarily he painted devotional images for private devotion and churches, including a considerable number of large altar paintings. His lively and colourful style made him extremely popular with people from all levels of society already during his lifetime. From 1780, mythological and low-life themes became increasingly frequent, only to be replaced by a renewed concentration on religious topics during the last years of Schmidt's life. He died at Stein/Danube (now belonging to Krems an der Donau), aged 82.

He was an important draughtsman and has left numerous etchings which clearly show Rembrandt's influence.

While his earlier works typically show a warm chiaroscuro, from about 1770 he used increasingly stronger and more lively colours. Simultaneously, both his style and his brush technique became much more free, making him, like Franz Anton Maulbertsch, an important predecessor of impressionism. In this aspect, his mature style is completely contrary to neoclassicism, the style which increasingly dominated European art after about 1780.
