= Rupert of Salzburg =

Medieval Catholic bishop and saint

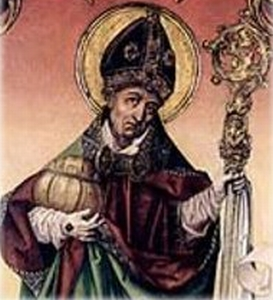
- Saint Rupert depicted with a barrel of salt in his hand

Bishop Apostle of the Bavarians
- Born: 660
- Died: 27 March 710; Salzburg, Duchy of Bavaria
- Venerated in: Roman Catholic Church; Eastern Orthodox Church
- Feast: 24 September; 27 March
- Attributes: Holding a container of salt; wearing clerical clothes including mitre; holding a crosier
- Patronage: Salzburg, The State of Salzburg, Austria, salt miners

Rupert of Salzburg (German: Ruprecht, (Note: Also known as Rudbertus, Roudbertus, Rupertus, Hrodperht, Hrodpreht, and Robert.) Latin: Robertus, Rupertus; c. 660 (Note: According to Schmid, "The assumption of 660 as the year of his birth is very likely legendary.") – 710 AD) was Bishop of Worms as well as the first Bishop of Salzburg and abbot of St. Peter's Abbey in Salzburg. He was a contemporary of the Frankish king Childebert III. Rupert is venerated as a saint in the Roman Catholic and Eastern Orthodox churches. Rupert is also patron saint of the Austrian state of Salzburg.

== Life ==
Holy tradition states that Rupert was a scion of the Frankish royal Merovingian dynasty; he was possibly related to the Robertians, and likely a descendant of Count palatine Chrodbert II.

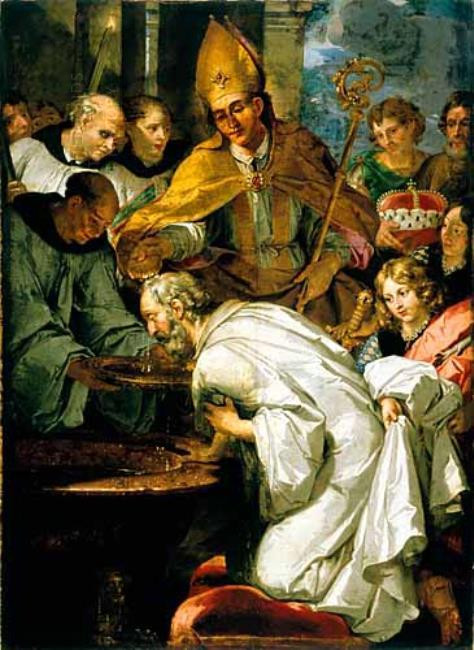
Baptism of Duke Theodo by Bishop Rupert, Franciscus de Neve (II) (c. 1670)

.

In his missionary work in Germany Rupert was accompanied by Saints Chuniald and Gislar, but no records of their acts have survived. As bishop at Worms, Rupert was first accepted as a wise and devout dignitary, but the mostly pagan community came to reject him and forced him out of the city by the end of the 7th century. The Agilolfing duke Theodo of Bavaria requested that he come to his residence at Regensburg (Ratisbon) to help spread the Christian faith among the Bavarian tribes.

Rupert then moved to Altötting, where he started his missionary work by preaching to the locals. He would sail down the Danube river, visiting many towns, villages and forts. Soon he had converted a large population along the Danube, reaching southeastward to the Bavarian border with the Pannonian lands, which were under the rule of the Avar Khaganate. Here, he stayed at Lorch, the former Roman city of Lauriacum (today part of Enns), where an early Christian church—the present Basilica of St. Lawrence—already existed.

Warlike conditions in the borderlands made him abandon plans of missionary work in the territories of the Pannonian Avars. Instead, he proceeded along the Roman road via Seekirchen to the ruined city of Juvavum, which he made his base and renamed "Salzburg" (Latin: Salisburgum). As in Lorch, Rupert was able to build on early Christian traditions that were already in place. He re-established the monastic community at St. Peter's Abbey and laid the foundations of Salzburg Cathedral, which was finished by his successor Vergilius. He also founded the Benedictine nunnery of Nonnberg beneath the Festungsberg fortifications (later Hohensalzburg Fortress), where his niece Erentrude became the first abbess.

Rupert also introduced higher education and other reforms. From Duke Theodo of Bavaria his bishopric received estates around Piding and Reichenhall, where he promoted the development of the local saltworks. Rupert's mission work also spread into the Alps, where the first monastic cell (Cella Maximiliana) was founded at present-day Bischofshofen about 711.

Rupert reportedly died on Easter Sunday around 710. According to other sources, he returned to his hometown of Worms, where he died in 717. His mortal remains were transferred to Salzburg Cathedral by Bishop Vergilius on 24 September 774.

== Veneration ==
Rupert's life and mission work is documented in medieval chronicles such as the Conversio Bagoariorum et Carantanorum. In accordance with Christian tradition, St. Rupert's feast day is celebrated by the Eastern Orthodox Church on the anniversary of his death, 27 March (28 March according to the Lutheran Calendar of Saints). In Austria, it is 24 September, commemorating the translation of his relics to Salzburg Cathedral. Rupertitag or Rupertikirtag is also a public holiday in the state of Salzburg, associated with popular Volksfest events.

Rupert is the patron saint of the state of Salzburg, the Roman Catholic Archdiocese of Salzburg (together with his successor Vergilius), and of the adjacent Bavarian Rupertiwinkel region. He is also known as the "Apostle of the Bavarians" and is patron of several settlements, such as Sankt Ruprecht in Styria and Šentrupert in Slovenia, and of numerous church buildings.

== Gallery ==
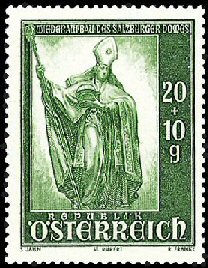
An Austrian stamp of 1948 depicting a statue of Saint Rupert

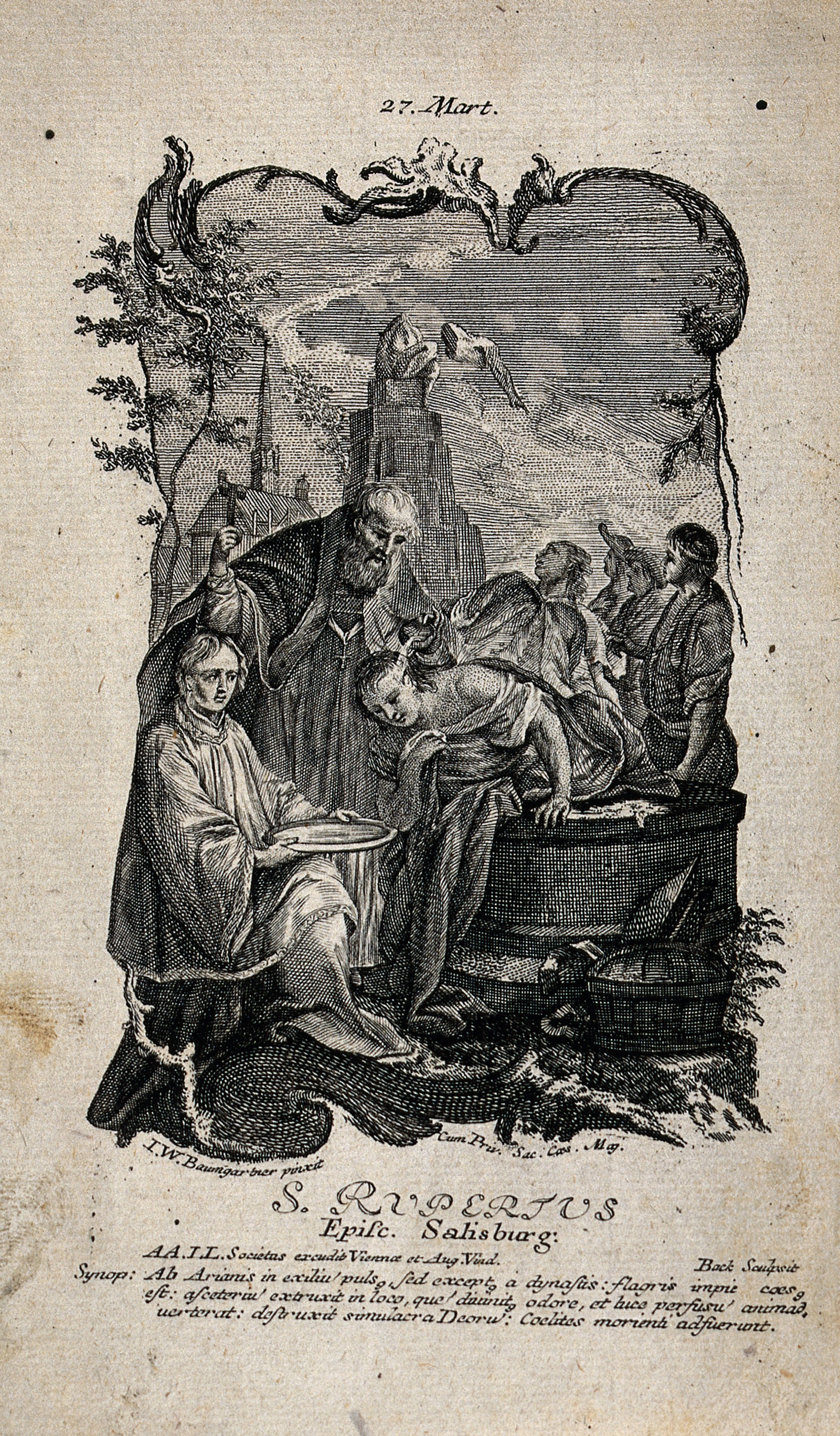
Etching of Saint Rupert by Bock after Johann Wolfgang Baumgartner

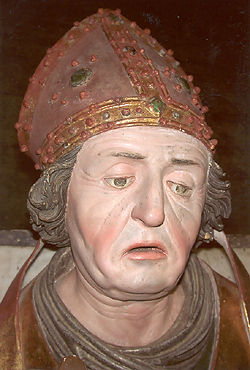
Head of a Gothic style statue of Saint Rupert

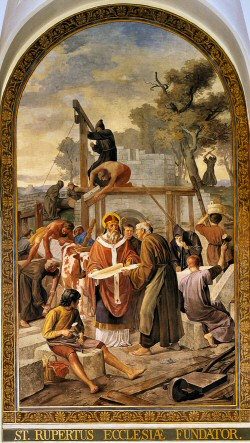
Saint Rupert, as a founder of a church ("fundator ecclesiae")

== See also ==
- Saint Rupert of Salzburg, patron saint archive

== Sources ==
- Delehaye, Hippolyte (1911). "Rupert, St" . Encyclopædia Britannica. Vol. 23 (11th ed.). p. 856.; Endnotes:
  - Bibliotheca hagiographica Latina, (Brussels, 1899), n. 7390-7403
  - W. Levison, "Die älteste Lebensbeschreibung Ruperts von Salzburg" in Neues Archiv für ältere deutsche Geschichtskunde, xxviii. 283 seq.
  - Hauck, Kirchengeschichte Deutschlands (3rd ed.), i. 372 seq.
  - O'Hanlon, John (1873), Lives of the Irish saints, vol. 9
