= Rupertikirtag =

Annual observance in Salzburg, Austria

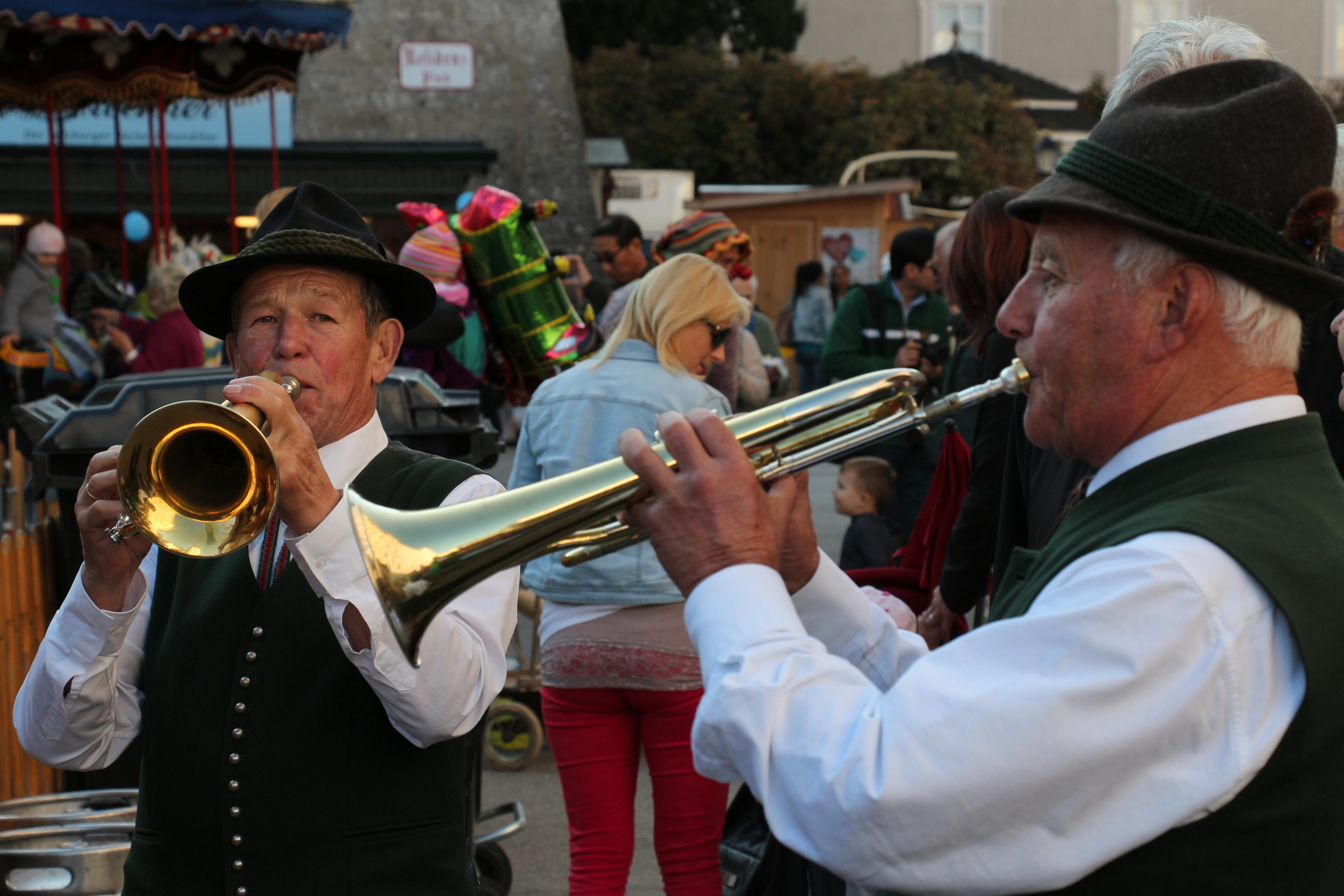
Musicians in traditional clothing at Rupertikirtag celebrations.

Rupertikirtag (St. Rupert's Day Fair) is an annual fair held on the city squares next to Salzburg Cathedral, in honour of Saint Rupert, patron saint of Salzburg, Austria. The fair is held every year in September, and features vintage fairground rides, market stalls, craft demonstrations, as well as a beer tent. The fair has been held annually since the 14th century.
