= Missa primi toni octo vocum =

1630 Mass by Stefano Bernardi

- by Stefano Bernardi
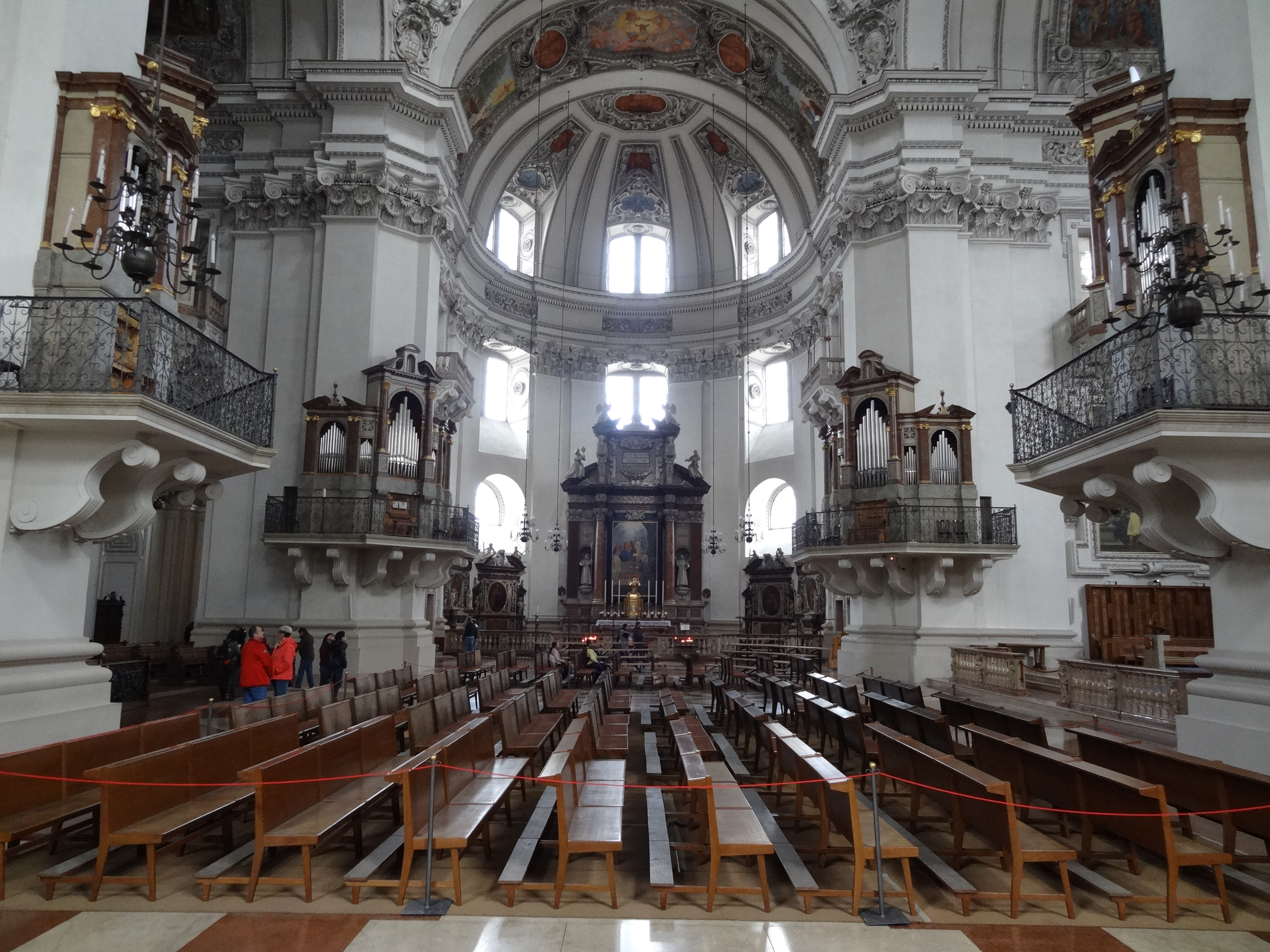
- Organ balconies at Salzburg Cathedral
- Text: Order of Mass
- Language: Latin
- Composed: 1630
- Movements: 5
- Vocal: double choir SATB
- Instrumental: continuo; optional instruments colla parte

The Missa primi toni octo vocum is a mass setting for double choir composed by Stefano Bernardi in 1630 for the Salzburg Cathedral where he was music director.

== History ==
Bernardi was called to serve as music director of the Salzburg Cathedral, after positions in Verona and Brixen. The exact time of his appointment is not known, but it was 1627 at the latest. Bernardi introduced the Italian stile concertato in Salzburg. The new cathedral building was completed and inaugurated in 1628, and Bernardi composed a Te Deum for 12 choirs for the occasion.

Bernardi composed the Missa primi toni octo vocum for two four-part choirs (SATB) and basso continuo for the cathedral in 1630. The only extant complete copy is held by the Salzburg Cathedral archive. Separate individual parts were found in Einsiedeln Abbey and in the Mondsee parish.

== Music ==
The mass is structured in five movements:

1. Kyrie
2. Gloria
3. Credo
4. Sanctus
5. Agnus

The Sanctus comes without a Benedictus setting. The music of both choirs is mostly in homophony. It was usual at the time to have instruments playing colla parte with the voices, in addition to continuo instruments, as described in Syntagma musicum by Michael Praetorius. A motif runs in all movements except the Sanctus, but it is not known if it was quoted, from a motet or a madrigal.

The Sanctus begins with long chords in the first choir, to which the second choir, after a long rest, adds more moving development.

== Publication ==
A publication in 1914 by Vinzenz Goller, as an appendix of Musica Diviny, omitted the Credo and the basso continuo, changed some of the text, added dynamic marking, and changed the note durations. A critical edition was published, edited by Armin Kircher, in 1993 by Comes in the series Denkmäler der Musik in Salzburg.

=== Uses ===
The mass has been performed at places such as St. Florian Monastery in Linz. The Dommusik of Carinthia at the Klagenfurt Cathedral used the mass to celebrate its 150th anniversary in 2012. Christmas 2013 was celebrated with the mass at the Speyer Cathedral. It was performed in 2022 for the livestream service on Easter Sunday at St. Maria im Dorn in Feldkirchen in Kärnten.
