= Unterfladnitz =

- Former municipality
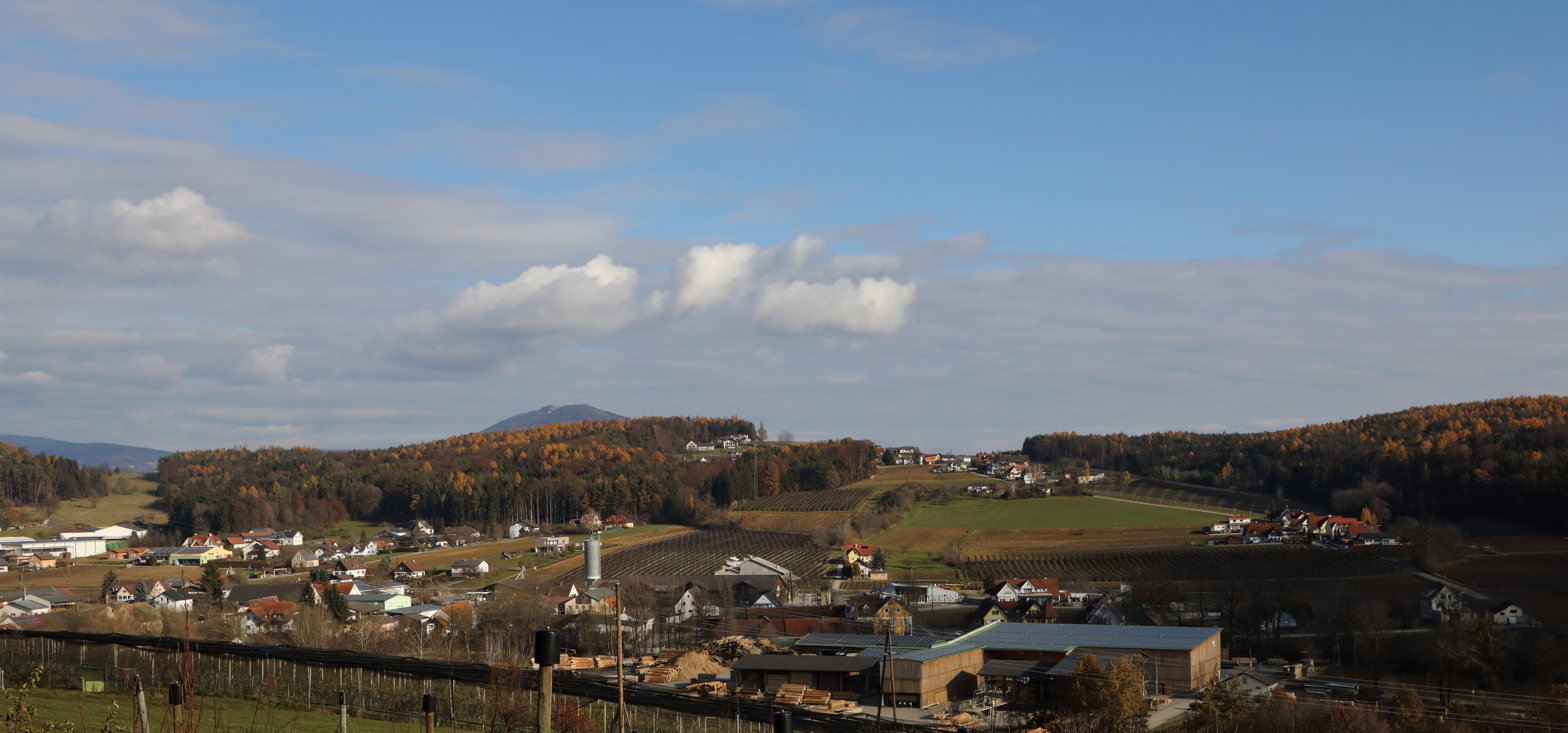
- View of Unterfladnitz

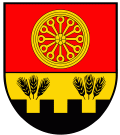
- Coat of arms

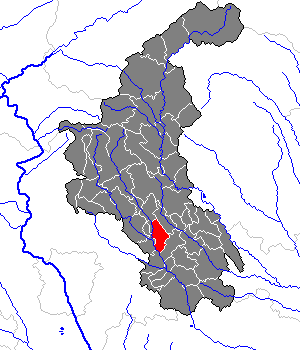
- Location within Weiz district

- Location within Austria
- Coordinates: 47°10′48″N 15°39′36″E
- Country: Austria
- State: Styria
- District: Weiz

Area
  - Total: 15.83 km^{2} (6.11 sq mi)
- Elevation: 406 m (1,332 ft)

Population (1 January 2016)
  - Total: 1,575
  - Density: 99.49/km^{2} (257.7/sq mi)
- Time zone: UTC+1 (CET)
  - Summer (DST): UTC+2 (CEST)
- Postal code: 8181
- Area code: 03178
- Vehicle registration: WZ
- Website: www.unterfladnitz.at

Unterfladnitz is a former municipality in the district of Weiz in the Austrian state of Styria. Since the 2015 Styria municipal structural reform, it is part of the municipality Sankt Ruprecht an der Raab.

== Geography ==
Unterfladnitz lies about 5 km from Weiz.
