= Salzburg Cathedral =

- Cathedral of Saints Rupert and Vergilius
- German: Salzburger Dom
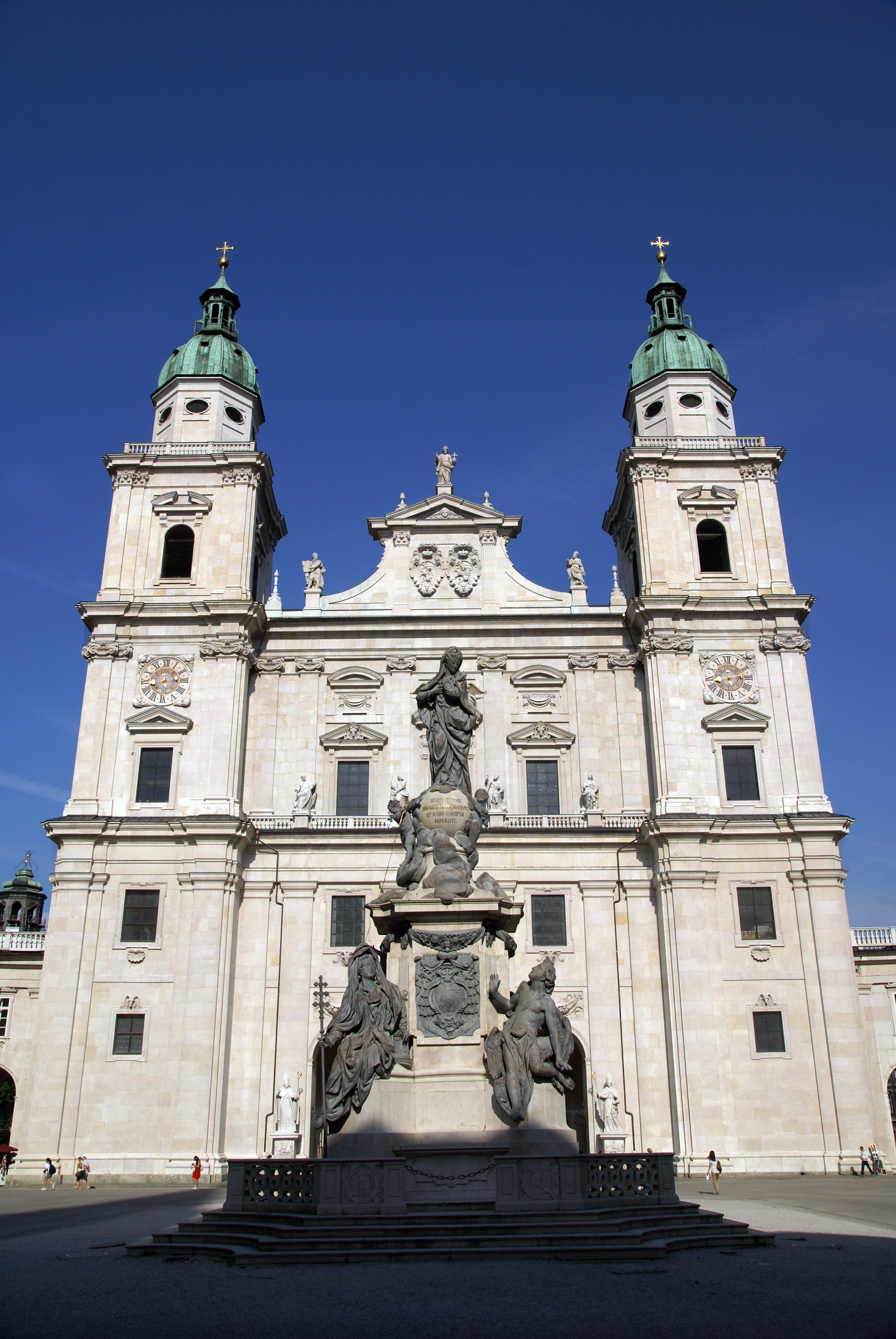
- Salzburg Cathedral
- 47°47′52″N 13°02′49″E
- Country: Austria
- Denomination: Roman Catholic
- Website: www.salzburger-dom.at

History
- Status: Active
- Founded: c. 774
- Founder: Rupert of Salzburg
- Dedication: Saint Vergilius; Saint Rupert

Architecture
- Functional status: Cathedral
- Architect: Santino Solari
- Style: Baroque
- Groundbreaking: 1614
- Completed: 1628; 1959 (restoration)

Administration
- Archdiocese: Salzburg

Clergy
- Archbishop: His Excellency Franz Lackner, O.F.M.

Salzburg Cathedral (German: Salzburger Dom) is the seventeenth-century Baroque cathedral of the Roman Catholic Archdiocese of Salzburg in the city of Salzburg, Austria, dedicated to Saint Rupert and Saint Vergilius. Saint Vergilius founded the church in 774 on the remnants of a Roman town, and the cathedral was rebuilt in 1181 after a fire. In the seventeenth century, the cathedral was completely rebuilt in the Baroque style under Prince-Bishop Wolf Dietrich von Raitenau to its present appearance. Salzburg Cathedral still contains the baptismal font in which composer Wolfgang Amadeus Mozart was baptized.

== History ==
Saint Vergilius of Salzburg constructed the first cathedral possibly using the foundations of St. Rupert. The first Dom was recorded in 774. The so-called Virgil Dom was built from 767 to 774 and was 66 metres long and 33 metres wide.

Archbishop Arno (785–821) arranged the first renovations of the Dom, less than 70 years after its completion. In 842, the building burned after a lightning strike. Three years later, work began to rebuild the structure.

Under Archbishop Hartwig, the sanctuary expanded to the west with addition of a choir and crypt between 1000 and 1080. Archbishop Konrad I added the west towers from 1106 to 1147.

This original church, thus experienced at least three extensive building and rebuilding campaigns during the early Middle Ages, the final result of which was a somewhat ad hoc Romanesque basilica. In 1598, the basilica was severely damaged, and after several failed attempts at restoration and reconstruction, Prince-Bishop Wolf Dietrich Raitenau (Archbishop from 1587 to 1612) finally ordered it demolished. Wolf Dietrich was a patron and supporter of modern Italian Baroque architecture, having seen it from its origins in Italy and particularly Rome. Indeed, it was Wolf Dietrich who was also responsible for the building of the nearby Alte Residenz, which is today connected to the cathedral.

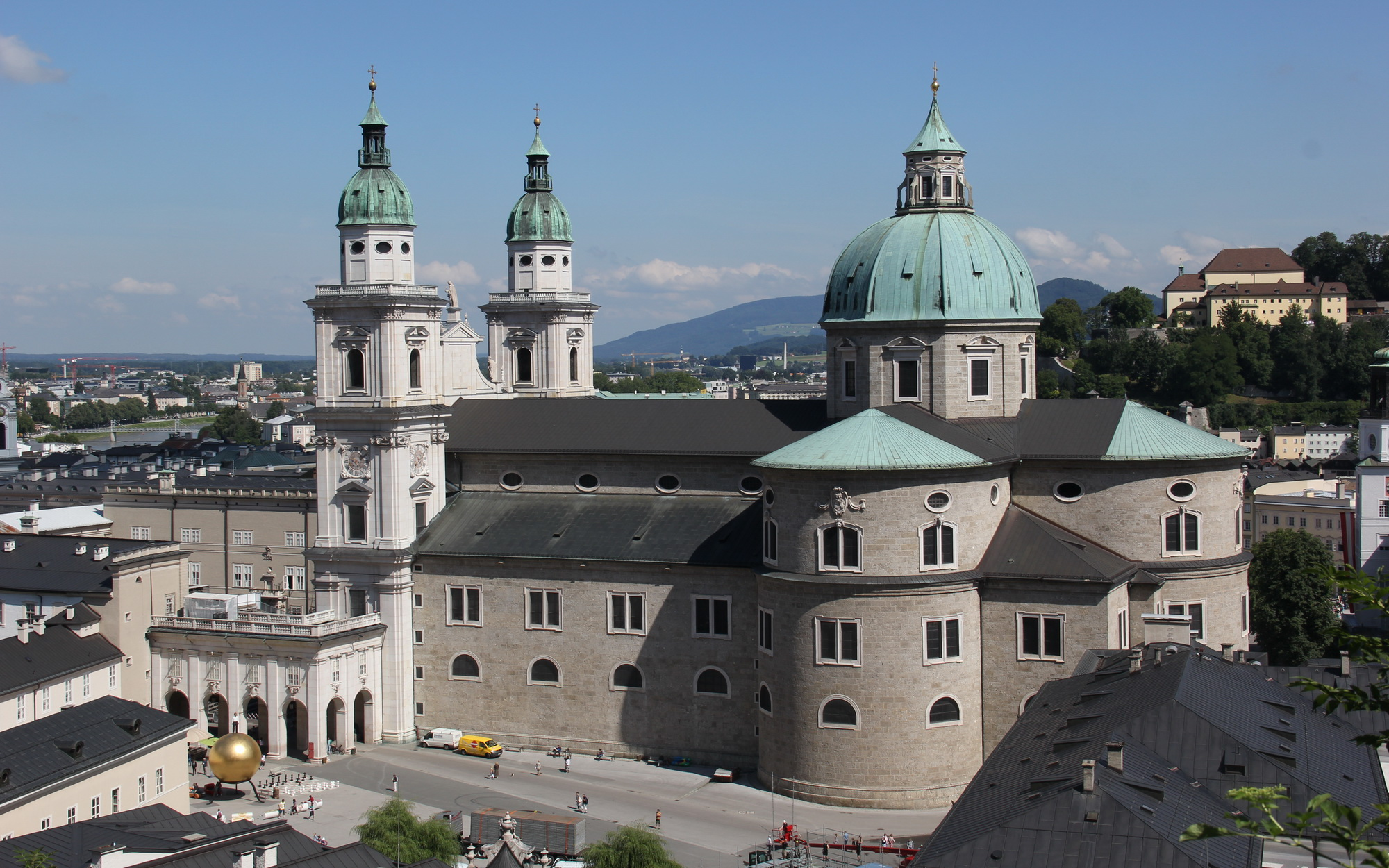
South façade

Wolf Dietrich hired the Italian architect Vincenzo Scamozzi to prepare a plan for a comprehensive new Baroque building. Construction did not begin however until Wolf Dietrich's successor, Markus Sittich von Hohenems (Archbishop from 1612 to 1619), in 1614 laid the cornerstone of the new cathedral. Santino Solari designed the current cathedral by dramatically altering the original Scamozzi plan. The new sanctuary was completed 1628, less than 15 years after construction began. At its consecration on 24 September 1628, 12 choirs positioned in the marble galleries of the cathedral sang a Te Deum (the score of which is since lost) composed by Stefano Bernardi, the Kapellmeister to the Salzburg court. He made use of the balconies in works such as the 1630 Missa primi toni octo vocum. The present Salzburg Cathedral is built partially upon the foundations of the old basilica. Indeed, the foundation stones of the preceding church building may be seen in the Domgrabungen, an excavation site under the cathedral that also features mosaics and other artifacts found when this location was the forum of the Roman city Juvavum. One other surviving relic that predates the baroque edifice is the 14th century Gothic baptismal font. The relics of Saint Rupert were transferred here when the cathedral was completed.

The finished church is 142 meters long and 33 meters high at the crossing/dome. The baroque style of St. Rupert's can be seen in the choir and the nave.

The Salzburg Cathedral was damaged in 1944 during World War II when a single bomb crashed through the central dome over the crossing. Repairs were somewhat slow to take place, but restoration was complete by 1959.

Wolfgang Amadeus Mozart was baptized here on 28 January 1756, the day after his birth.

== Exterior ==
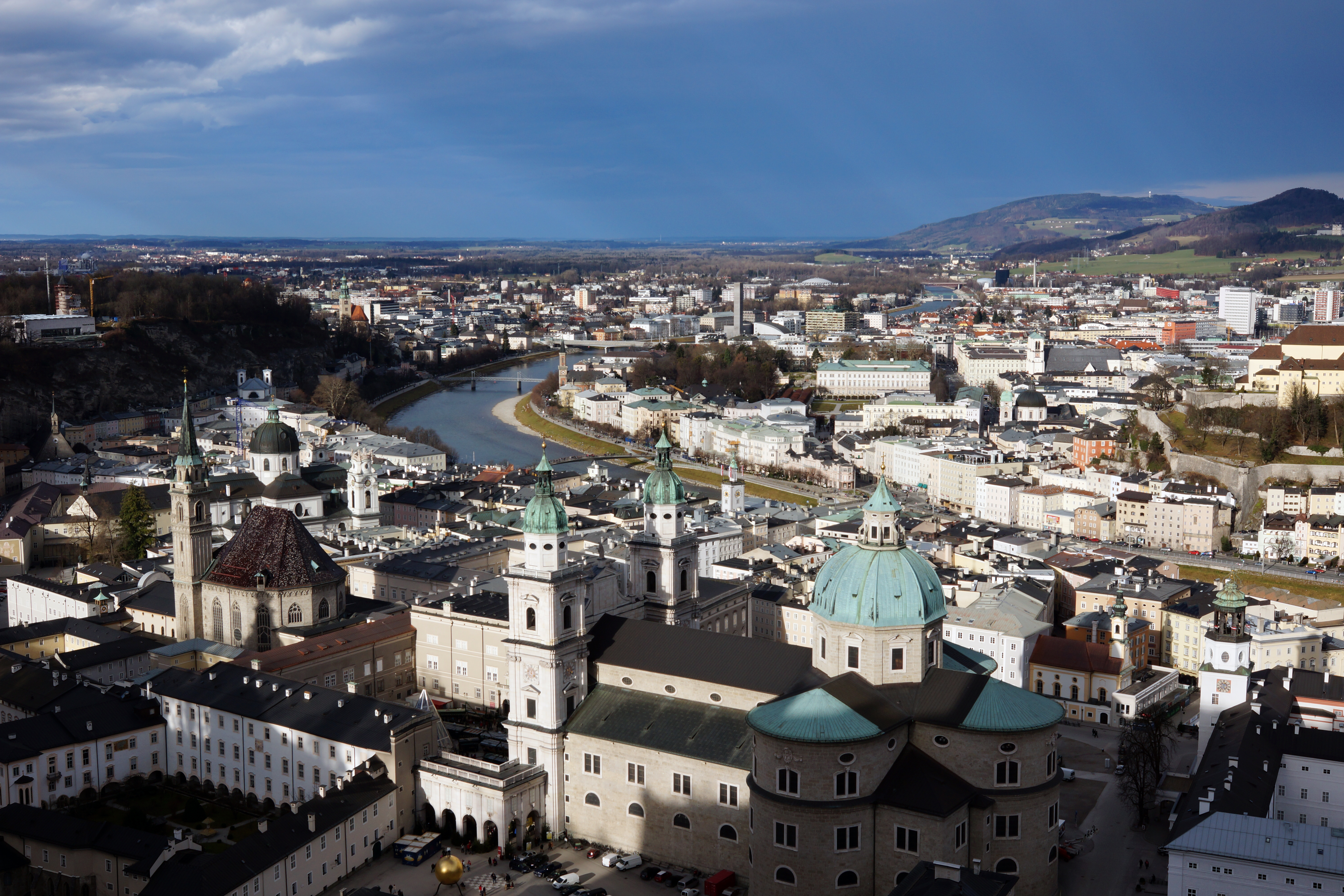
Salzburg Cathedral from the Hohensalzburg fortress

Salzburg Cathedral is located adjacent to Residenzplatz and Domplatz in the Altstadt (Old Town) area of the city. The Domplatz is accessed by three open arcade arches in the north, south, and west. These "cathedral arches" unite the cathedral with the Salzburg Residenz and St. Peter's Abbey to form a unique enclosed square measuring 101 meters long and 69 meters wide, with walls 81 meters high.

The Domplatz is dominated by the Maria Immaculata (Immaculate Mary) column, commissioned by Archbishop Sigismund von Schrattenbach and executed by the brothers Wolfgang and Johann Baptist Hagenauer between 1766 and 1771. Modeled after similar columns in Vienna and Munich and constructed of marble and cast iron, the Maria Immaculata depicts the Virgin Mary enthroned on a mountain of clouds made of Untersberg marble and a globe. The central Marian figure is surrounded on four sides by allegoric figures representing angels, the devil, wisdom, and the Church. According to a plaque on the side of the cathedral, the figure group shows reactions to the mystery of the Immaculate Conception—the angels are delighted, human wisdom vanishes, the envious devil growls, and the triumphant Church rejoices. When viewed from the center of the arcades at the back of Domplatz, the classicist column is positioned in the central axis of the cathedral and shows the central Marian figure surrounded by the angels on the cathedral façade and seems to wear the crown mounted on the building.

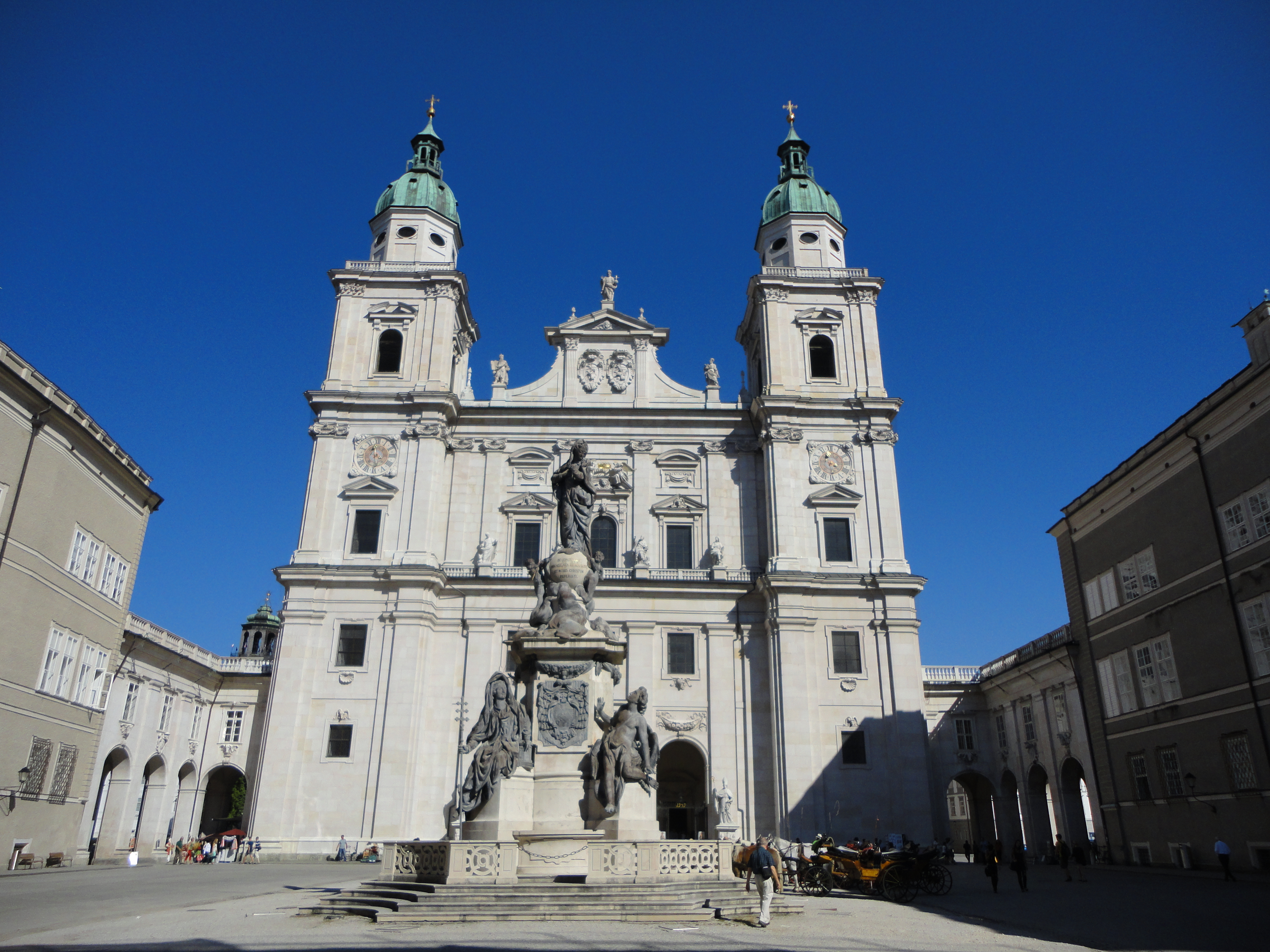
Marian column in Domplatz

The body of the church is made of dark grey stone with ornamentation and façade of bright Untersberg marble. The richly decorated façade is framed by two towers and topped by a curved gable. The north tower houses an old oven used for baking communion bread. The façade is divided into three horizontal sections. The lower section has three high round arches or portals that provide access to three bronze doors. The portals are flanked by four large sculpted figures representing the diocesan and cathedral patrons. Mitred figures of Saint Rupert holding a salt barrel and Saint Virgilius holding a church were created c. 1660 by Bartholomäus van Opstal and flank figures of Saint Peter holding keys and Saint Paul holding a sword, sculpted c. 1697 by Bernhard Michael Mandl, who also created all the pedestals. The bases bear the arms of the Prince Archbishop Guidobald von Thun and Prince Archbishop Johann Ernst von Thun.

Along the balustrade above the entrance are statues of the four evangelists—Saint Matthew, Saint Mark, Saint Luke, and Saint John—who represent the salvation offered through their preaching. The pediments over the three windows behind the evangelists depict a lion and an ibex, the animals depicted in the coats of arms above. Above the center window, a golden crown aligns with the Marian column in the Domplatz. The top section tympanum bears the arms of the builders of the cathedral, Markus Sittikus and Paris Lodron. The figure group on the pediment represents the Transfiguration of Jesus on Mount Tabor, showing Christ as Salvator Mundi, with Moses holding the tablets on the left and the prophet Elijah to the right. The three statues were created in 1660 by Tommaso di Garona, the mason who built the Residenz Fountain.

The three bronze gates inside the portals date from 1957 and 1958 and represent the three divine virtues (Göttliche Tugenden) of faith, hope, and love. The Tor des Glaubens (gate of faith) on the left was created by Toni Schneider-Manzell (1911–1996), the central Tor der Liebe (gate of love) was created by Giacomo Manzù (1908–1991), and the Tor der Hoffnung (gate of hope) on the right was created by Ewald Mataré (1887–1965).

== Bells ==
The cathedral has 7 ringing bells in total, 2 of which are bourdon bells. The largest bell or bourdon is named Salvator and it is the second largest bell in Austria, after the Pummerin bell in Vienna Cathedral. The clappers are held against the sound bow whilst the bells are raised, then released sequentially to give a clean start to the ringing. At the end they are successively caught again by the mechanism to silence the bells. Only 2 of the 7 bells serve as clock bells; Joseph chimes every quarter hour while the second bourdon Rupert chime each the number of a full hour. In Austria, the bells are always numbered from largest to smallest, Bell 1 is always the tenor or bourdon.

Nr. (Note: Die Nummerierung der Glocken am Salzburger Dom erfolgt entgegen der Norm, der größten Glocke die N0. 1 zuzuordnen.)	Name (German)	Name (English)	Year	Caster	Diameter (mm)	Mass (kg)	Note' (ST-1/8)	Tower	Inscription [German]	Inscription [English]
1	Salvatorglocke (Bourdon Bell)	Salvator	1961	Robert Schwindt and Ing. Georg Sippel (de:Glockengießerei Oberascher)	2790	14,256	E♭^{0} +4	North	"Dich, Gott, loben wir, Dich Herr, preisen wir, Dich, den Vater unermessbarer Majestät, Deinen wahren und einzigen Sohn und den Heiligen Fürsprecher Geist. Wir loben in Ewigkeit Deinen Namen."	["We praise You, O God; we praise You, Lord; we bless You, the Father of immeasurable majesty, Your true and only Son, and the Holy Spirit. We praise Your name forever and ever."
2	Rupertglocke (2nd Bourdon Bell)	Rupertus	1961	Robert Schwindt and Ing. Georg Sippel (Glockengießerei Oberascher)	2330	8,273	G♭^{0} +4	South	"Heiliger Rupertus, Schutzpatron unserer Erzdiözese, erhalte uns den Glauben!"	"Saint Rupert, patron saint of our archdiocese, preserve our faith!"
3	Marienglocke	Maria	1628	Wolfgang and Johann Neidhart	1830	4,004	B♭^{0} +4	South	"Heilige Maria, Pforte des Himmels, öffne deine Hilfen den Flehenden und halte alle Angriffe des widerwärtigen Feindes fern beim Klange dieses Metalles, das deinem glorreichen Namen geweiht hat Paris aus dem Geschlecht derer von Lodron, Erzbischof und Fürst von Salzburg im Jahre des Heiles 1628."	["Holy Mary, Gate of Heaven, open your help to those who supplicate and keep away all attacks of the foul enemy with the sound of this metal, which Paris of the Lodron family, Archbishop and Prince of Salzburg, consecrated to your glorious name in the year of our salvation 1628."]
4	Josefsglocke	Josef	1961	Robert Schwindt and Ing. Georg Sippel (Glockengießerei Oberascher)	1560	2,517	D♭^{1} +4	South	"Sankt Josef ist von Gott ersehn, das Werkvolk zu beschirmen. Das unbesiegt es möge stehen, in aller Zeiten Stürmen."	"Saint Joseph is chosen by God to protect the working people. May they stand unconquered, through all the storms of time."
5	Virgilglocke	Virgil	1628	Wolfgang and Johann Neidhart	1360	1,648	E♭^{1} +4	South	"Hl. Rupert, Lehrer und getreuester Patron! Damit du für deine Herde die Ohren Gottes fleißig bestürmst und Pest, Hunger, Krieg und die Nachstellungen des Erzfeindes vertreibst, ließ diese Glocke dir weihen Paris aus dem Geschlecht derer von Lodron, Erzbischof und Fürst von Salzburg, im Jahre des Heiles 1628."	"St. Rupert, teacher and most faithful patron! So that you may diligently assail the ears of God for your flock and drive away plague, hunger, war, and the snares of the archenemy, Paris had this bell consecrated to you from the Lodron family, Archbishop and Prince of Salzburg, in the year of our Lord 1628."
6	Leonhardsglocke	Leonhard	1961	Robert Schwindt and Ing. Georg Sippel (Glockengießerei Oberascher)	1190	1,025	G♭^{1} +4	South	"Gott schütze die Salzburger Bauernschaft."	"God protect the Salzburg peasantry."
7	Barbaraglocke	Barbara	1961	Robert Schwindt and Ing. Georg Sippel (Glockengießerei Oberascher)	1040	715	A♭^{1} +4	South	"Heilige Barbara, Patronin der Sterbenden, bitte für uns!"	"Saint Barbara, patroness of the dying, pray for us!"

== Gallery ==
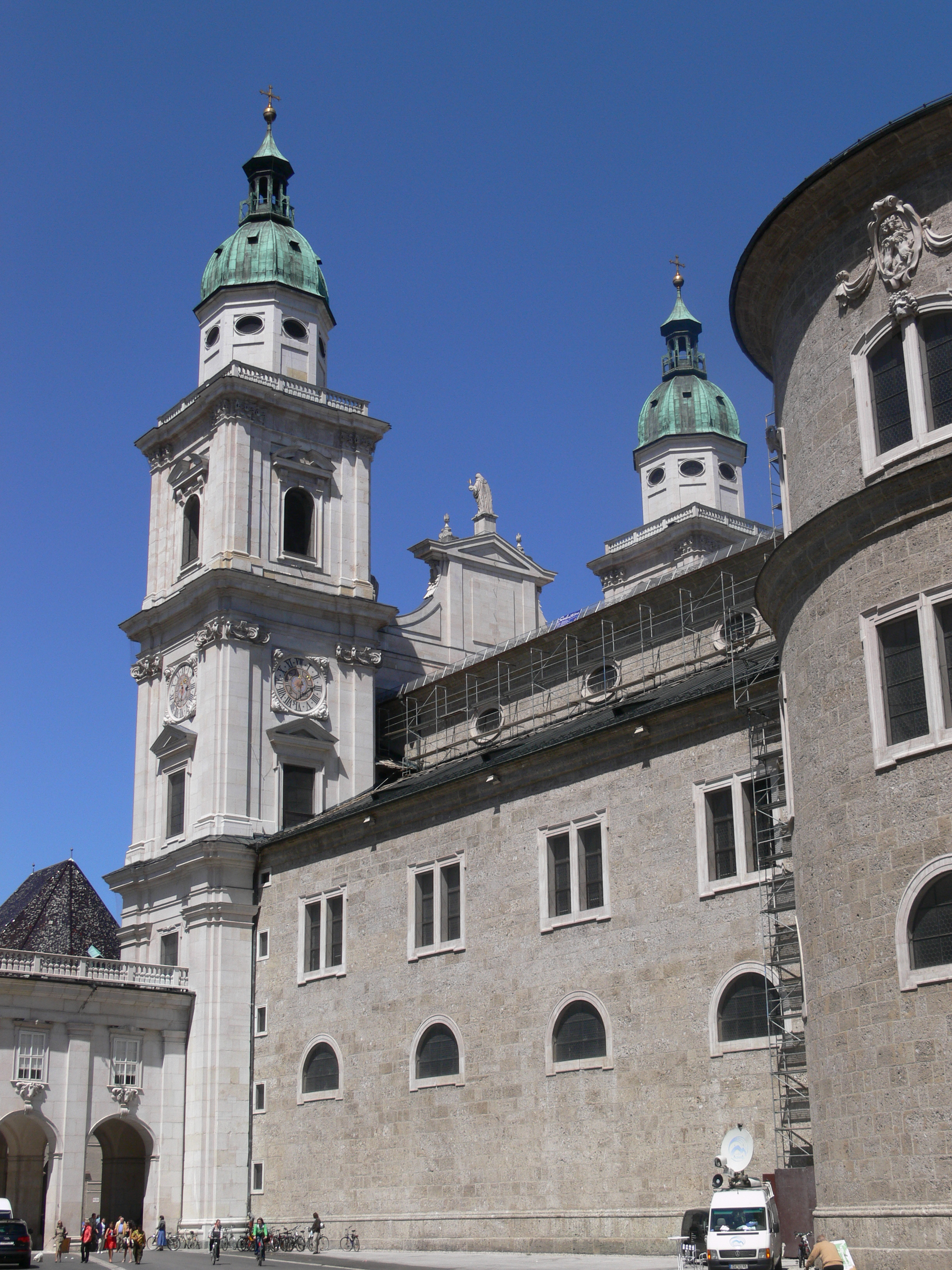
South façade from Kapitelplatz

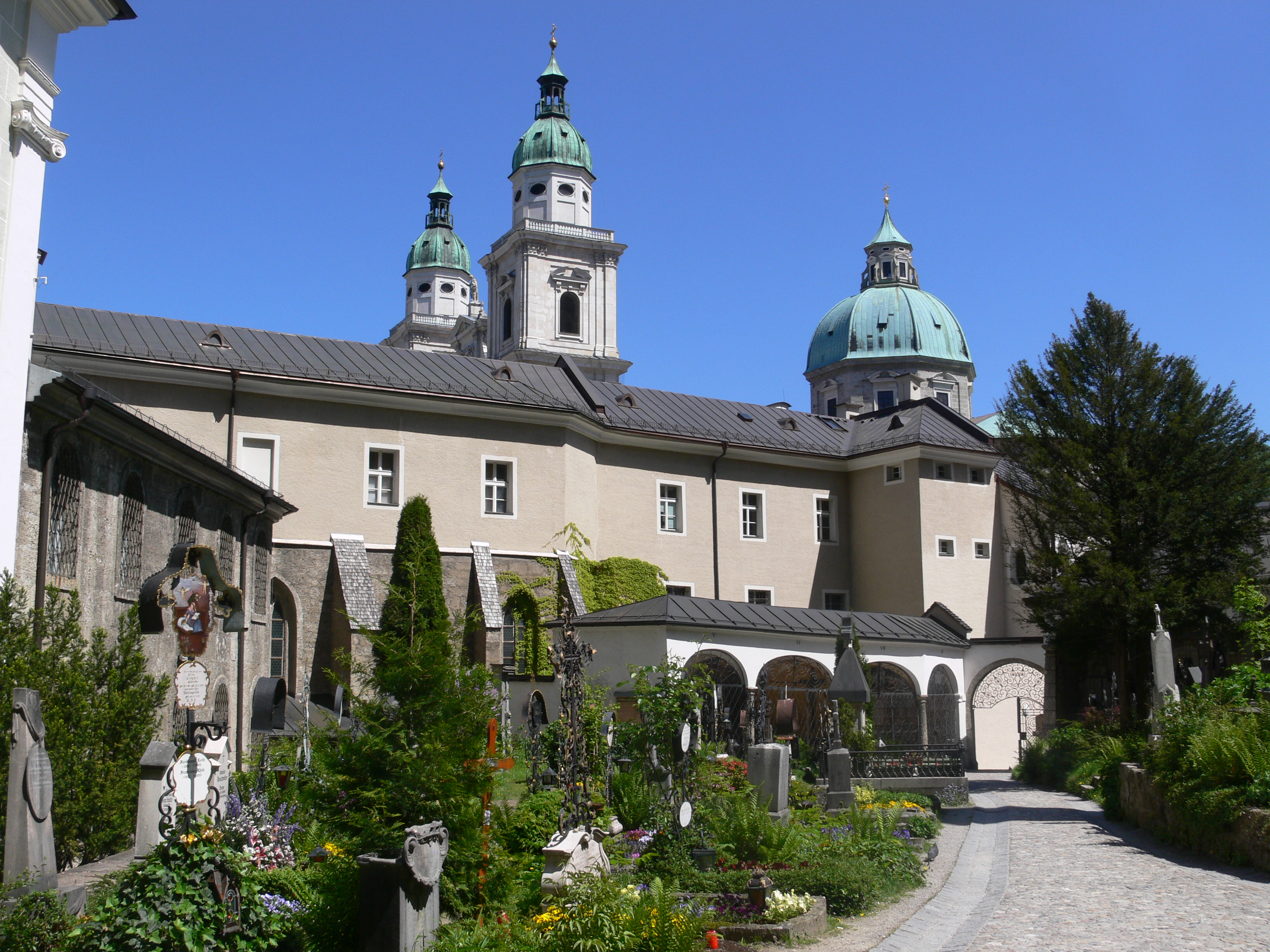
North façade from Petersfriedhof

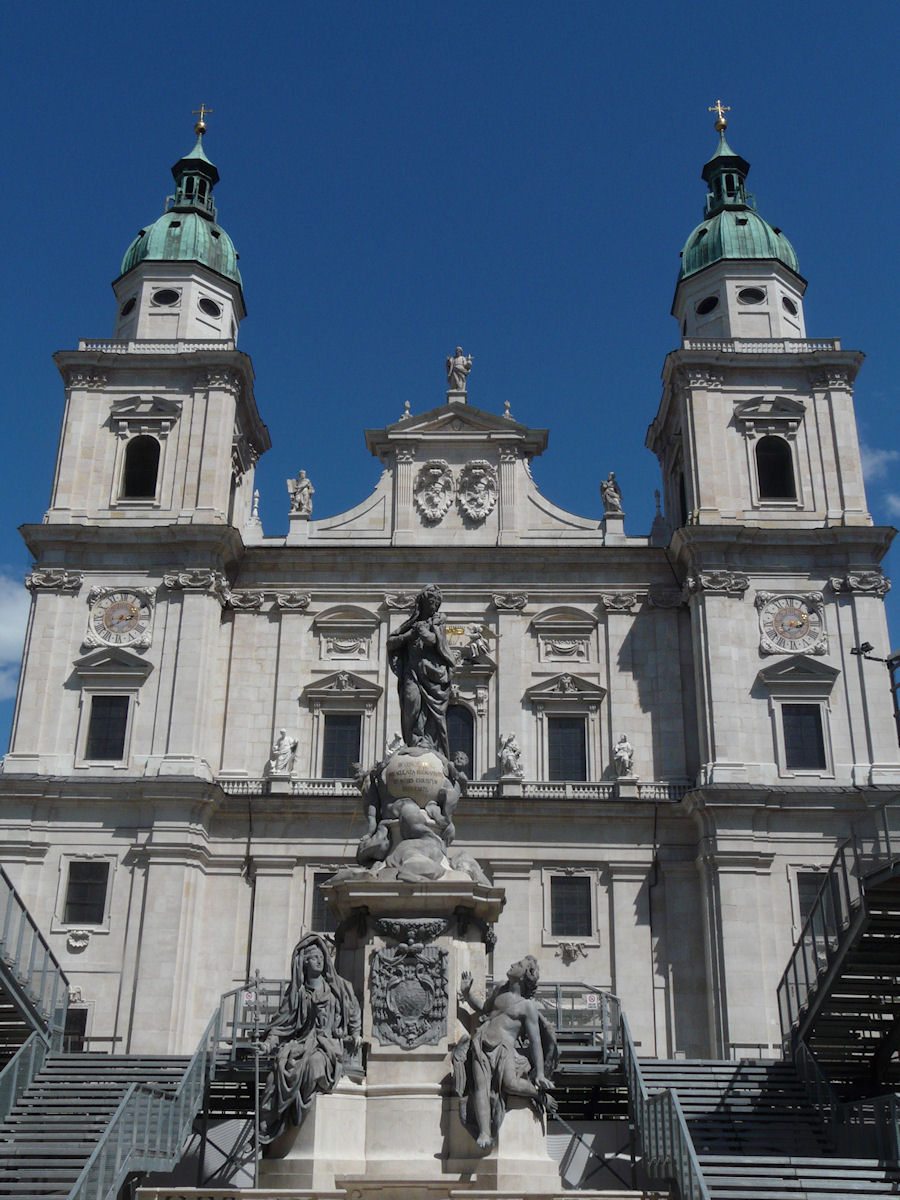
West façade

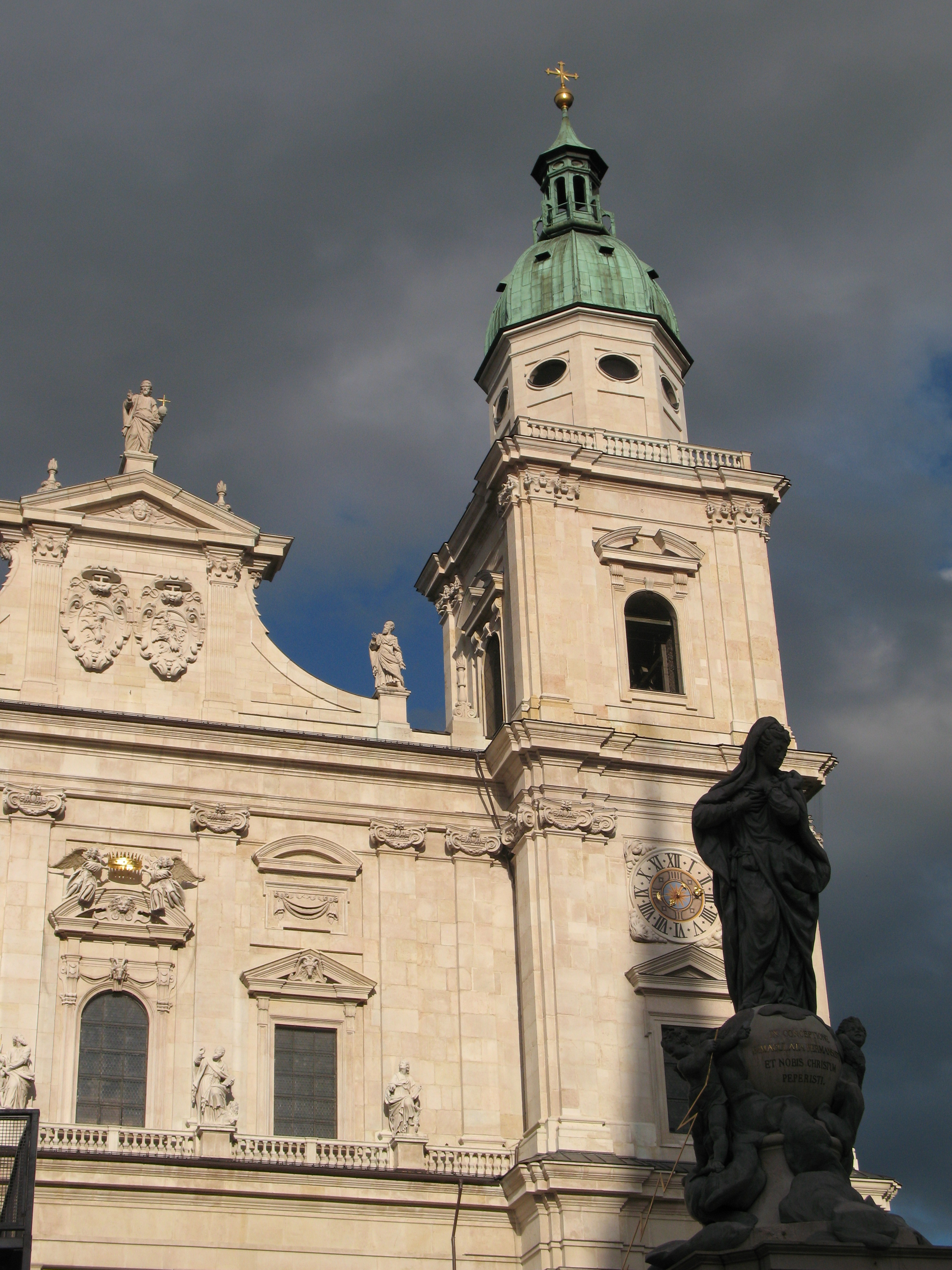
South tower detail and Marian column

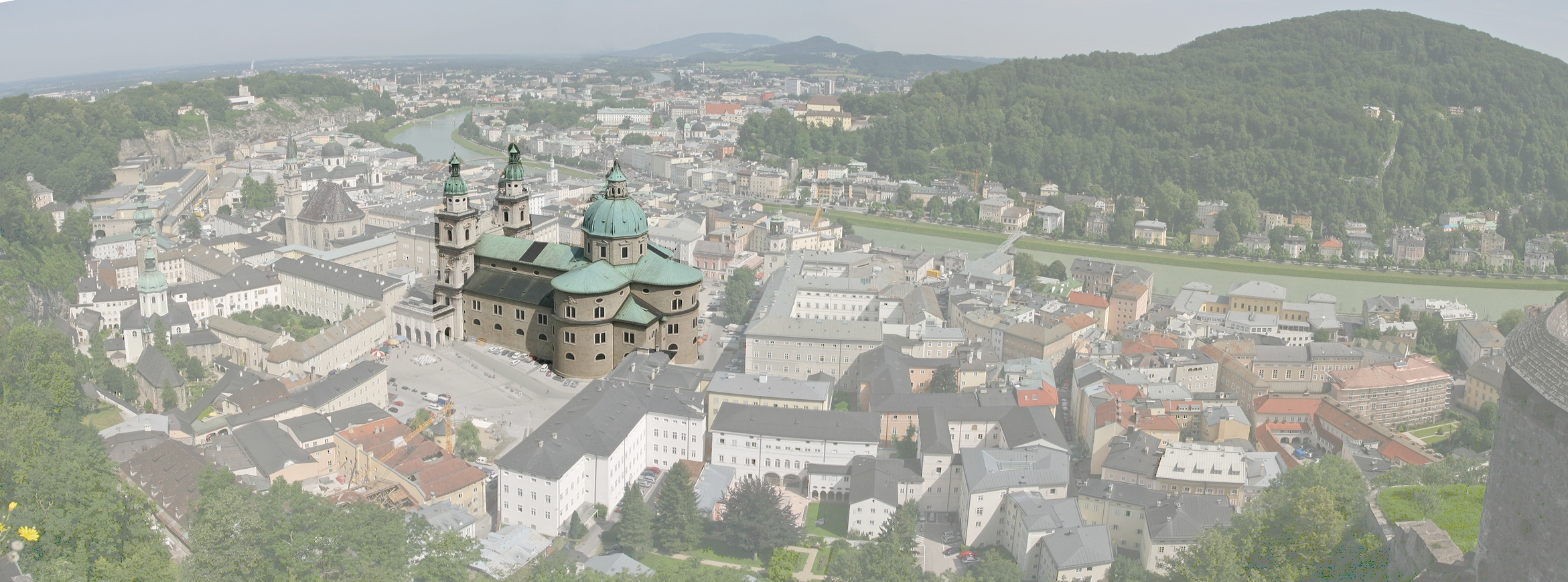
Salzburg Cathedral location looking north

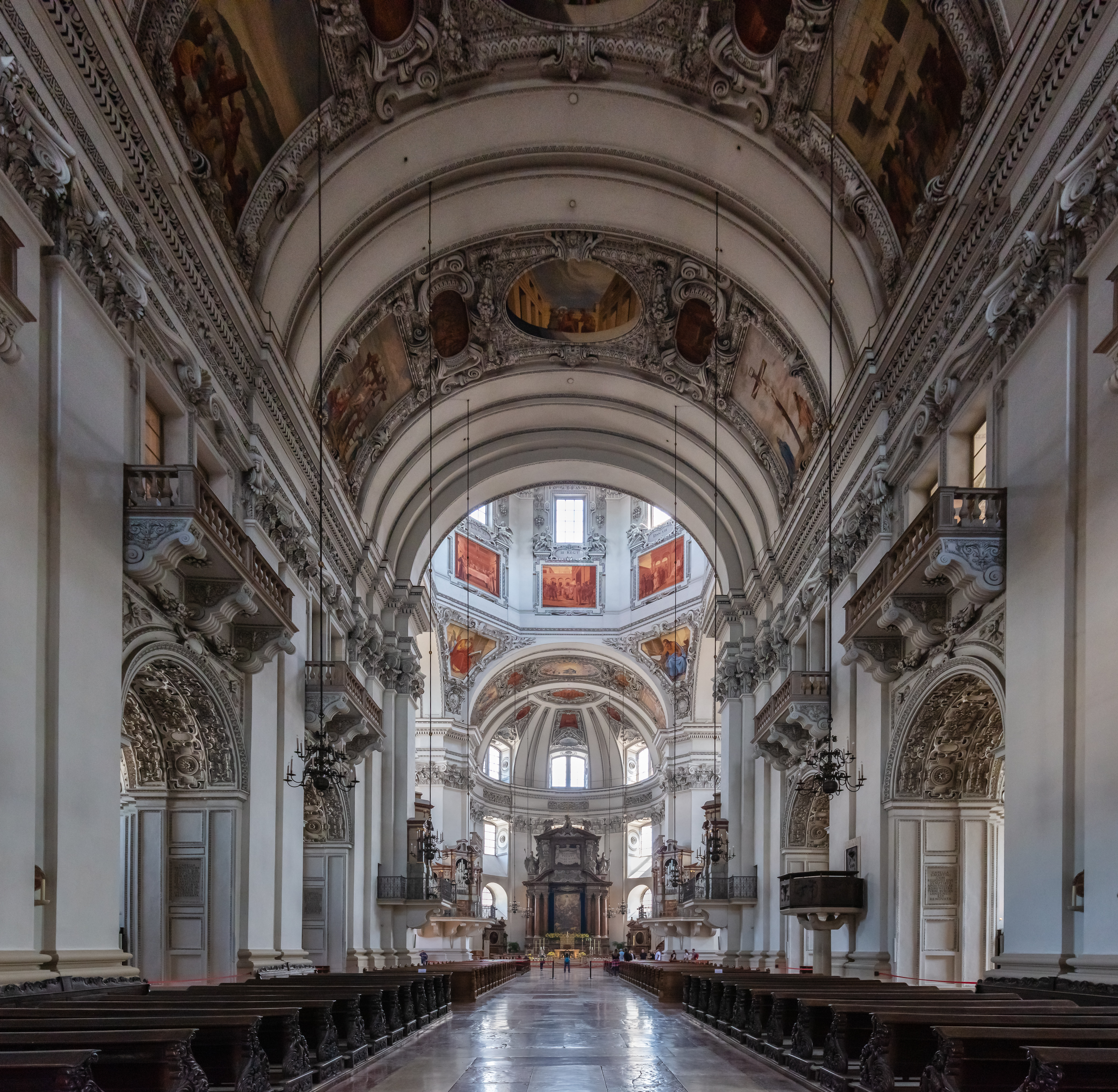
Main nave

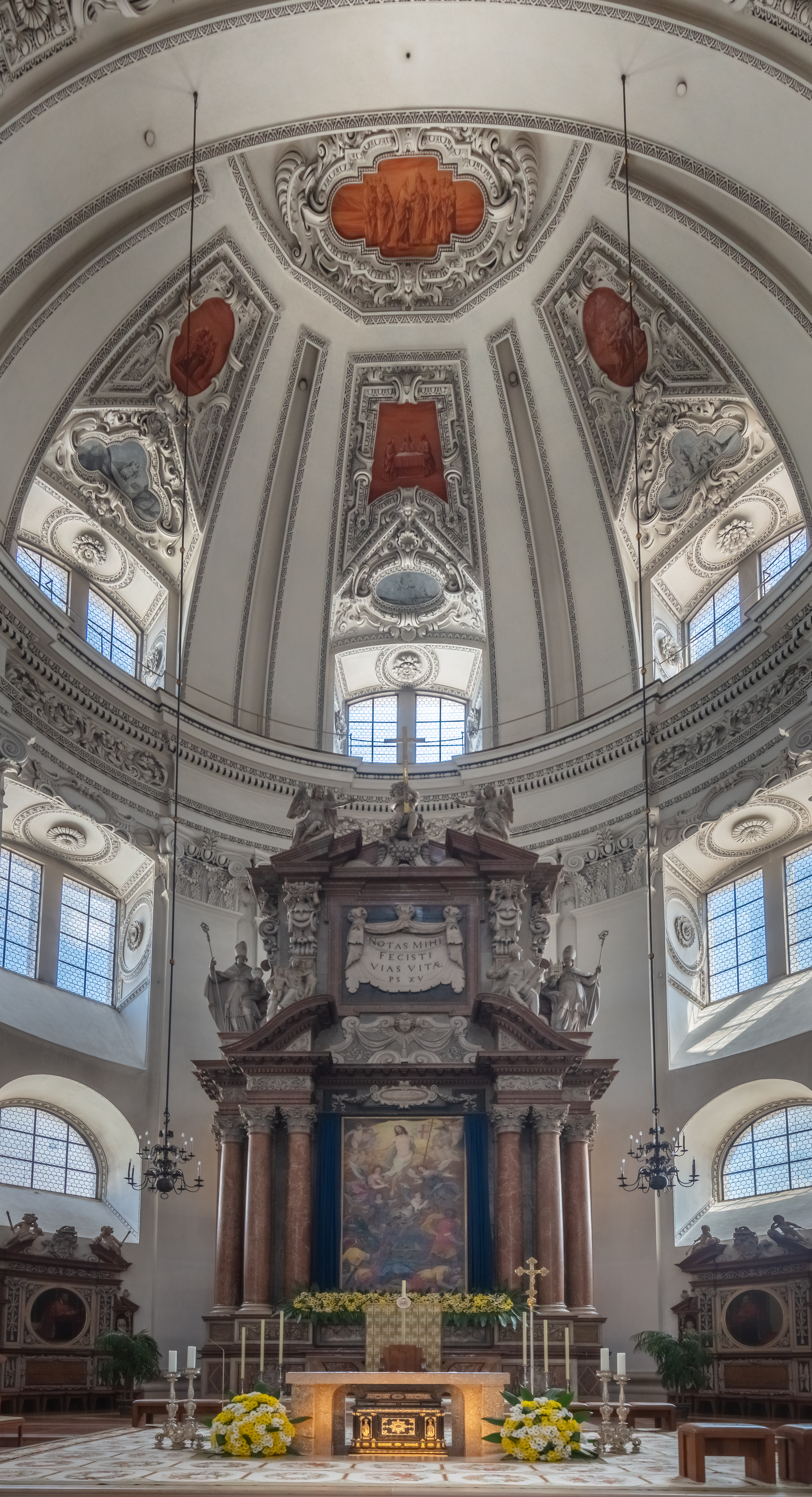
Altar

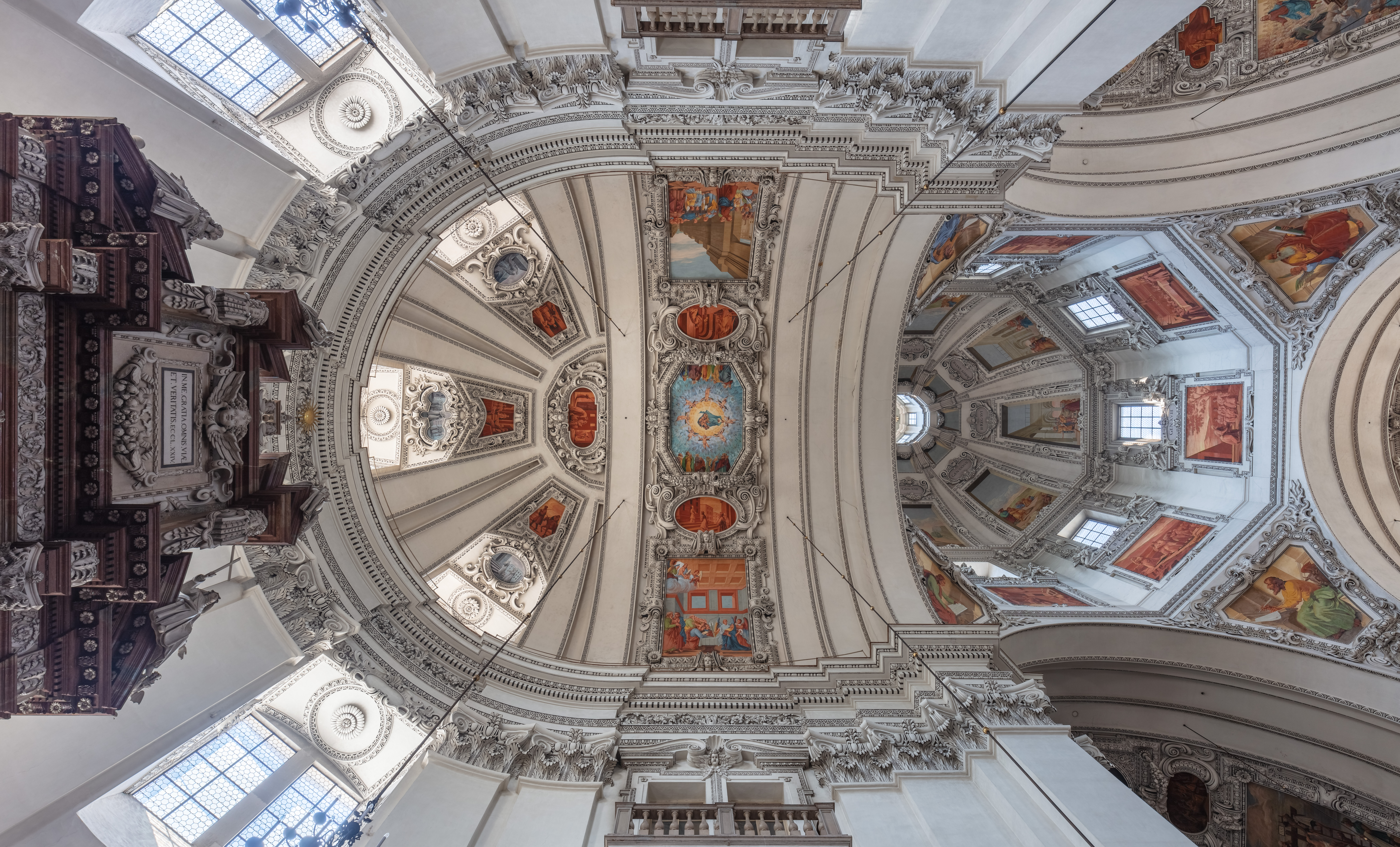
Ceiling

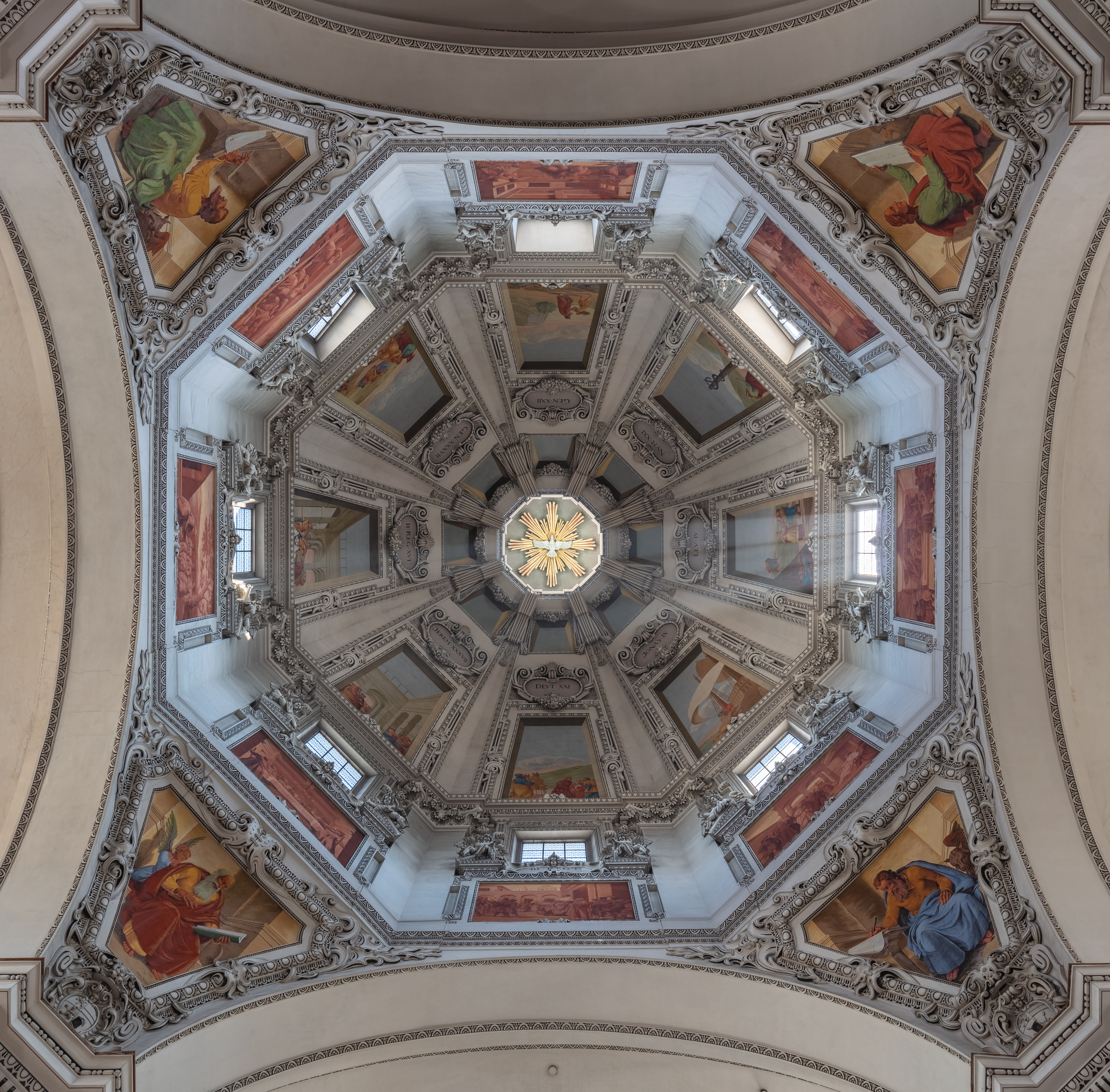
Central dome

== See also ==
- Rupertikirtag
