= Chuniald =

7th-century Irish priest and missionary

Saint Chuniald
- Born: 7th century Ireland
- Residence: Salzburg
- Feast: 24 September

Saint Chuniald (or Conald, Cunibald, Chunibald, Kuniald) was an early Irish priest and missionary who worked for many years in Germany. He lived in the 7th century.

== Butler's life ==
According to Alban Butler,

He was one of those eminent Scottish or Irish missionaries who left their native country to carry the faith of Christ into Germany. He was for many years the constant companion of St. Rupert (Note: According to Colgan, St. Rupert, who is honoured on the 27th of March, was also a Scot from Ireland. The same author asserts that St. Conald was one of the twelve holy missionaries who accompanied St. Rupert, and that his relics were taken up by St. Virgilius, and exposed to public veneration at Saltzburg in 773.), bishop of Saltzburg, in all his apostolical functions. He is mentioned in some Martyrologies on the 27th of February, but his feast is kept on the 24th of September, the day of the translation of his relics. See Colgan, Act. SS. p. 769.

== O'Hanlon's notes ==
John O'Hanlon discusses Chuniald in his Lives of the Irish saints (1873). He notes that no special record exists of the acts of Saint Rupert's companions, Saints Chuniald and Gislar, if any such existed. Many writers refer to them as companions of Saint Rupert during his missionary career in Germany, so it may be assumed they were born in Ireland around the middle of the 7th century. However some, including the Hollandist Father Constantine Suyskens, thought that Rupert, Chuniald and Gisilar were natives of Gaul. Radler states that although the three were sent from eastern France to convert the Norici, they all were born in ancient Scotia or Hibernia. In 773 or 774 the relics of the saints were transferred to a church dedicated to Rupert in Salzburg. The relics were transferred again in 993 and 1315, but Chuniald is not mentioned in reports of the later transfers.

== Sources ==
- Butler, Alban (1823), The Lives of the Irish Saints, Extracted from the Writings of the Rev. Alban Butler, and Now Placed in Order, with a Prefixed Callender; to which is Added, an Office and Litany in Their Honour, with a Defence of the Monastic Institute. By a Cistercian Monk, J. Coyne This article incorporates text from this source, which is in the public domain.
- O'Hanlon, John (1873), Lives of the Irish saints, vol. 9 This article incorporates text from this source, which is in the public domain.
- "September", Orthodox Europe
