= Stefano Bernardi =

Italian composer (1580–1637)

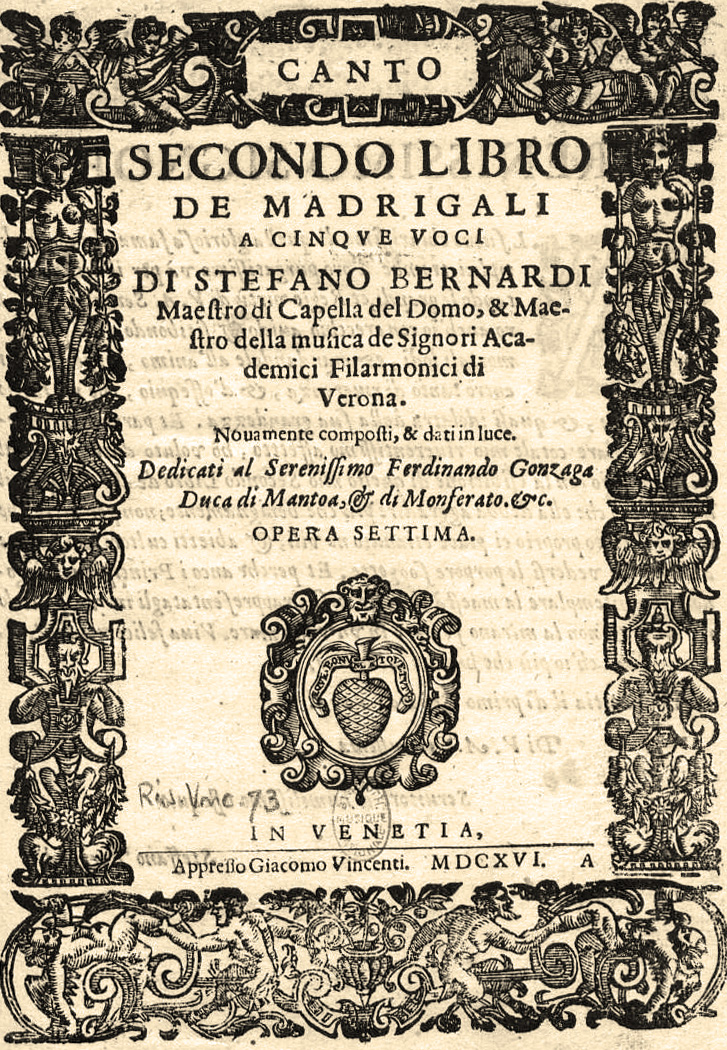
- Title page of Bernardi's Secondo libro de madrigali a cinque voci, Venice 1616
- Born: 18 March 1580; Verona
- Died: 15 February 1637; Verona
- Occupations: Priest; Composer; Music theorist
- Organizations: Verona Cathedral; Salzburg Cathedral

Stefano (or Steffano) Bernardi (18 March 1580 – 15 February 1637), also known as "il Moretto", was an Italian priest, composer and music theorist. Born in Verona and maestro di cappella at the Verona Cathedral from 1611 to 1622, he later moved to Salzburg, where he was responsible for the music at the Salzburg Cathedral and composed a Te Deum for 12 choirs performed at the cathedral's consecration in 1628.

Bernardi's career spanned the transition from late Renaissance music to early Baroque, with some of his works in the polyphonic style of Palestrina and others in the new stile concertato. He composed both sacred and secular music, including several masses and motets as well as sinfonias and three books of madrigals. He also wrote a treatise on counterpoint published in 1615.

== Biography ==
Bernardi was born in Verona and educated at the Scuola Accolitale (Acolyte College) attached to the Verona Cathedral, where he also sang in the choir under Ippolito Baccusi. By 1602 he was a paid musician at the court of Count Mario Bevilacqua and at the Accademia Filarmonica in Verona. In 1606, the Accademia elevated his position to maestro della musica (Music Master). The following year Bernardi went to Rome for further training and stayed there for four years, becoming the maestro di cappella of Santa Maria ai Monti in 1610. He returned to Verona in 1611 when he was offered the same position at the Verona Cathedral as the successor to Francesco Anerio. He held that post until 1622 and during that time was also closely associated with the Accademia Filarmonica. He published a treatise on counterpoint, Porta musicale, in 1616 primarily for the students at the Scuola Accolitale where he also taught. Amongst his students in Verona in those years were Antonio Bertali and Pietro Verdina.

In 1622 Bernardi left Verona to take up a post as Director of Court Music to Archduke Carl Joseph, Bishop of Breslau and Brixen. Following the Archduke's death in 1624, Bernardi settled in Salzburg, where he was to become the Director of Court Music for Paris von Lodron, the Prince-Bishop of Salzburg, a position he held until 1634. As such, he was also deeply involved in the musical life of Salzburg Cathedral, where he was one of the first composers to introduce the new Italian stile concertato. For its consecration in 1628, Bernardi composed a Te Deum (music now lost) sung by twelve separate choirs placed in the various marble galleries of the cathedral. While in Salzburg, he was ordained a priest and also received a doctorate in canon and civil law. Towards the end of his life, Bernardi returned to Verona where he died in 1637.

== Works ==
Most of Bernardi's works were published in his lifetime, primarily in Venice by Giacomo Vincenti, and later by Alessandro Vincenti who also published a posthumous collection of Bernardi's Messe a otto voci (Masses for eight voices) in 1638. Two collections of his works were published in Rome: Motecta (motets) for two to five voices in 1610, four of which were also anthologized by Georg Victorinus in his Siren coelestis published in Munich in 1616, and a collection of madrigals for three voices in 1611 which also contains a six-part "peasants' masquerade". The music has been lost for two of the works he composed in Salzburg, the Te Deum and a dramatic work (title unknown). However Encomia sacra for two to six voices which he wrote in Salzburg was published there by Gregor Kyrner in 1634. His Salmi concertati for five voices published in 1637 is considered particularly important for the way the psalms highlight an alto or soprano soloist against a four voice choir which echoes the beginnings and endings of the solo passages. In addition to five psalms for vespers, the collection also contains a Magnificat and the hymn, Jesu nostra redemptio. Another important work was the Concerti Accademici which Bernardi composed for the Accademia Filarmonica in Verona between 1615 and 1616. Originally published in 1616 and containing what Magnabosco considers his finest pieces of secular music, it consists of ten madrigali concertati (concerted madrigals) and eight sinfonias. A modern edition of the Concerti Accademici by Flavio Cinquetti and Matteo Zenatti, with critical revision and an essay by Marco Materassi was published in 2008.

=== Sacred music ===
Most works were published in Venice, and the years indicate publication dates.

- Motecta for two to five voices (Rome, 1610)
- Psalmi integri for four voices (Venice, 1613)
- Motetti in cantilena for four voices (Venice, 1613)
- Mass for four to five voices (Venice, 1615)
- Missae octonis vocibus modulatae for eight voices (Venice, 1616)
- Concerti sacri scielti, et trasportati dal secondo, et terzo libro de madrigali for five voices and organ (Venice, 1621)
- Psalmi for eight voices, one with organ accompaniment (Venice, 1624)
- Te Deum for 12 choirs (first performed on September 24, 1628 in the Salzburg Cathedral, music lost)
- Missa primi toni octo vocum (1630)
- Encomia sacra for two to six voices (Salzburg, 1634)
- Salmi concertati for five voices (Venice, 1637)
- Messe a otto voci for eight voices (Venice, 1638)

=== Secular music ===
- Il primo libro de madrigali for three voices (Rome, 1611)
- Il primo libro de madrigali for five voices (Venice, 1611)
- Il secondo libro de madrigali for five voices (Venice, 1616)
- Concerti academici con varie sorti di sinfonie for six voices (Venice, 1616)
- Il terzo libro de madrigali for five voices concertati (Venice, 1619)
- Madrigaletti for two to three voices, also contains several sonatas for three instruments—two violins or cornetts and one theorbo, trombone or fagotto (Venice, 1621)
- Il terzo libro de madrigali for six voices concertati with several instrumental sonatas (Venice, 1624)

=== Writings ===
- Porta musicale per la quale il principiante con facile brevità all'acquisto delle perfette regole del contrapunto vien introdotto (Verona, 1615)

== Sources ==
- Arnold, Dennis (1983). "Bernardi, Stefano" in The New Oxford Companion to Music. Oxford University Press, p. 215.
- Buelow, George J. (2004). A History of Baroque Music. Indiana University Press. ISBN 0-253-34365-8
- Fisher, Alexander (2008). "Celestial Sirens and Nightingales: Change and Assimilation in the Munich Anthologies of Georg Victorinus ", Journal of Seventeenth-Century Music Volume 14, no. 1. ISSN 1089-747X
- Jensen, Niels Martin (1992). "The Instrumental Music for Small Ensemble of Antonio Bertali: The Sources". Danish Yearbook of Musicology Volume 20 pp. 25–43
- Kurtzman, Jeffrey G. (1995). Vesper and Compline Music for One Principal Voice. Routledge. ISBN 0-8153-2165-1
- Magnabosco, Michele (2007). "Stefano Bernardi: il primo dei moderni". Cadenze. Accademia Filarmonica di Verona, Anno III n. 10 June–August 2007.
- Paganuzzi, Enrico (2001). "Verona". In Sadie, Stanley; Tyrrell, John (eds.). The New Grove Dictionary of Music and Musicians (2nd ed.). London: Macmillan Publishers. ISBN 978-1-56159-239-5.
- Roche, Jerome & Roche, Elizabeth (2001). "Bernardi, Stefano [Steffano]". In Sadie, Stanley & Tyrrell, John (eds.). The New Grove Dictionary of Music and Musicians (2nd ed.). London: Macmillan Publishers. ISBN 978-1-56159-239-5.
- Randel, Don Michael (ed.) (1996). "Bernardi, Stefano" in The Harvard Biographical Dictionary of Music. Harvard University Press (1996) pp. 73–74. ISBN 0-674-37299-9, ISBN 978-0-674-37299-3
- Sadie, Julie Anne (1998) "Bernardi, Stefano" in Companion to Baroque Music. University of California Press, pp. 80–81. ISBN 0-520-21414-5
- Sadie, Stanley (2006). Mozart: The Early Years 1756-1781. Oxford University Press. ISBN 0-19-816529-3
