= Sankt Ruprecht an der Raab =

- Municipality
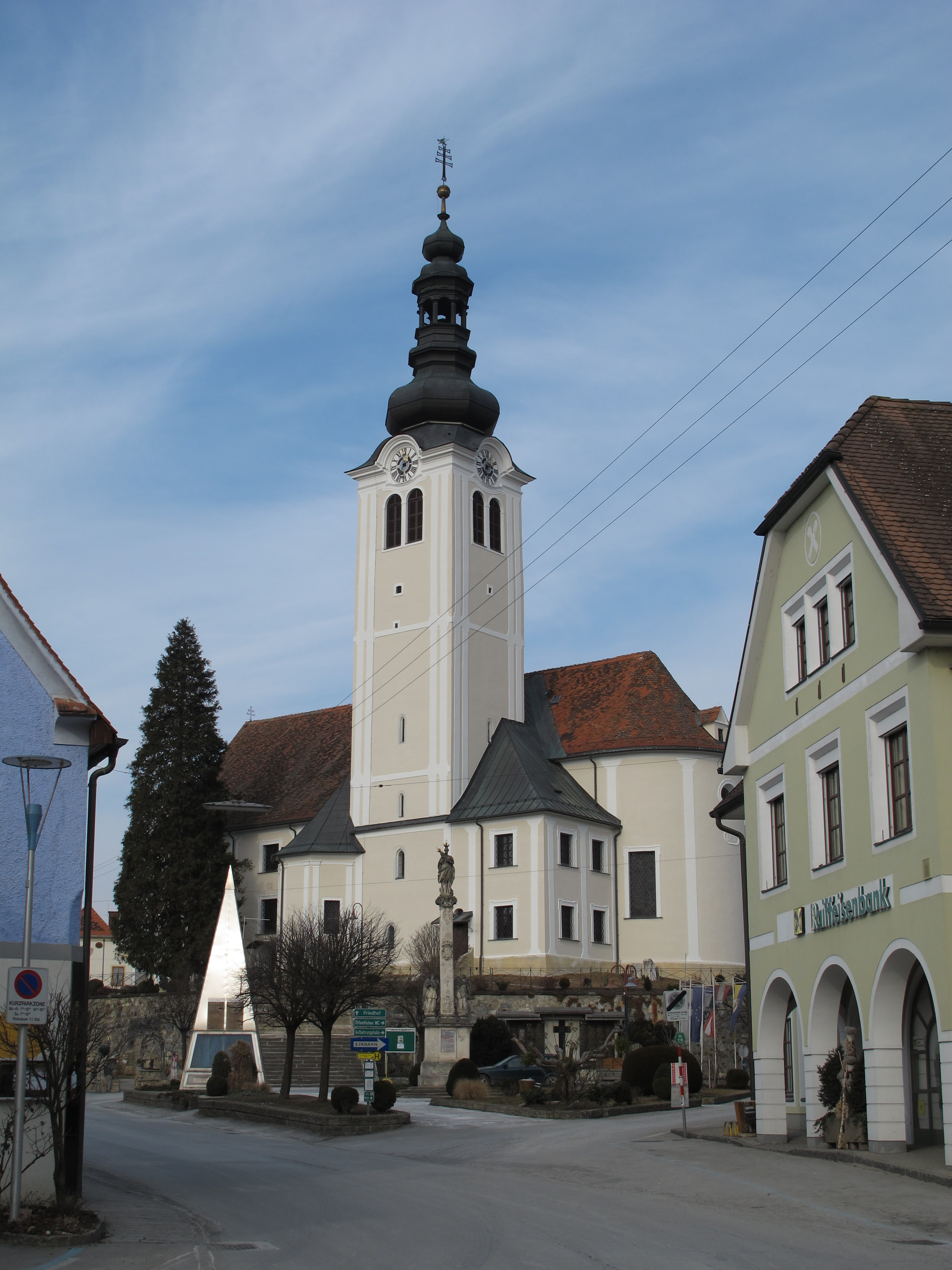
- Sankt Ruprecht parish church

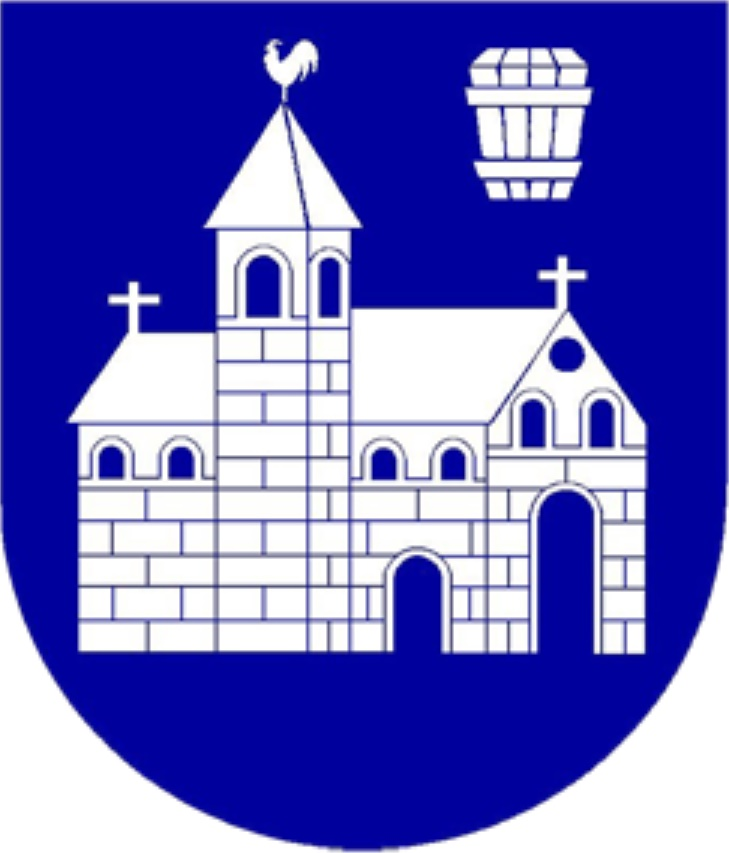
- Coat of arms

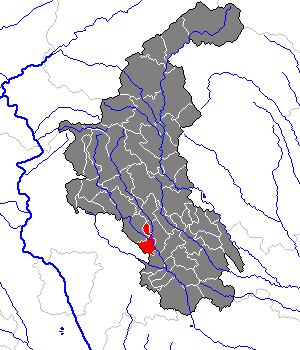
- Location within Weiz district

- Location within Austria
- Coordinates: 47°09′00″N 15°39′00″E
- Country: Austria
- State: Styria
- District: Weiz

Government
  - Mayor: Herbert Pregartner (ÖVP)

Area
  - Total: 41.11 km^{2} (15.87 sq mi)
- Elevation: 388 m (1,273 ft)

Population (2018-01-01)
  - Total: 5,300
  - Density: 130/km^{2} (330/sq mi)
- Time zone: UTC+1 (CET)
  - Summer (DST): UTC+2 (CEST)
- Postal code: 8181
- Area code: 03178
- Vehicle registration: WZ
- Website: www.ruprecht.at

Sankt Ruprecht an der Raab is a market town with 5,421 residents (as of 1 January 2021) in the district of Weiz in Styria, Austria. In the Styria municipal structural reform on 1 January 2015, the town was merged with the nearby towns Etzersdorf-Rollsdorf and Unterfladnitz.

== Geography ==
Sankt Ruprecht an der Raab is located in Weiz District on Landesstraße B 64 in the Austrian state (Bundesland) of Styria (Steiermark).

=== Municipality organization ===
The municipal region covers the following 13 places (in Klammern population as of 1 January 2015), of these 9 joined in the merger:

Former regions of Sankt Ruprecht an der Raab:

- Fünfing bei Sankt Ruprecht an der Raab (648)
- Grub bei Sankt Ruprecht an der Raab (190)
- Sankt Ruprecht an der Raab (1,219)
- Wolfgruben b. Sankt Ruprecht a.d. Raab (212)

Former regions of Unterfladnitz:

- Arndorf bei Sankt Ruprecht an der Raab (241)
- Dietmannsdorf (80)
- Kühwiesen (210)
- Neudorf bei Sankt Ruprecht an der Raab (293)
- Unterfladnitz (285)
- Wollsdorf (467)

Former regions of Etzersdorf-Rollsdorf:

- Etzersdorf (513)
- Lohngraben (244)
- Rollsdorf (367).

The municipality includes several Katastralgemeinden communities: Arndorf, Dietmannsdorf, Etzersdorf, Fünfing bei St. Ruprecht, Grub, Kühwiesen, Lohngraben, Neudorf bei St. Ruprecht, St. Ruprecht an der Raab, Unterfladnitz, Wolfsgruben bei St. Ruprecht und Wollsdorf. The town region covers an area of 41.06 km^{2} (15.85 sq mi).

== History ==
Sankt Ruprecht an der Raab is one of the oldest places in Styria. At the first Nennung in the year 860, it was named "ad Rapam". Kaiser Friedrich III noted the town on 1 September 1462.
